= Hohenheim (disambiguation) =

Hohenheim is a neighborhood in Stuttgart, Germany. The name can also refer to:

- Hohenheim Castle
- University of Hohenheim

People and families carrying the toponymic surname "von Hohenheim" include:

- Theophrastus von Hohenheim, better known as Paracelsus
  - Van Hohenheim, a character in the anime series and manga Fullmetal Alchemist based on Paracelsus
- Bombast von Hohenheim, a Swabian noble family that went extinct in 1566
- Franziska von Hohenheim, for whom the Swabian name and title was revived in 1774
- A non-player character in Limbus Company by the same name.
