= Plieningen =

- Borough of Stuttgart
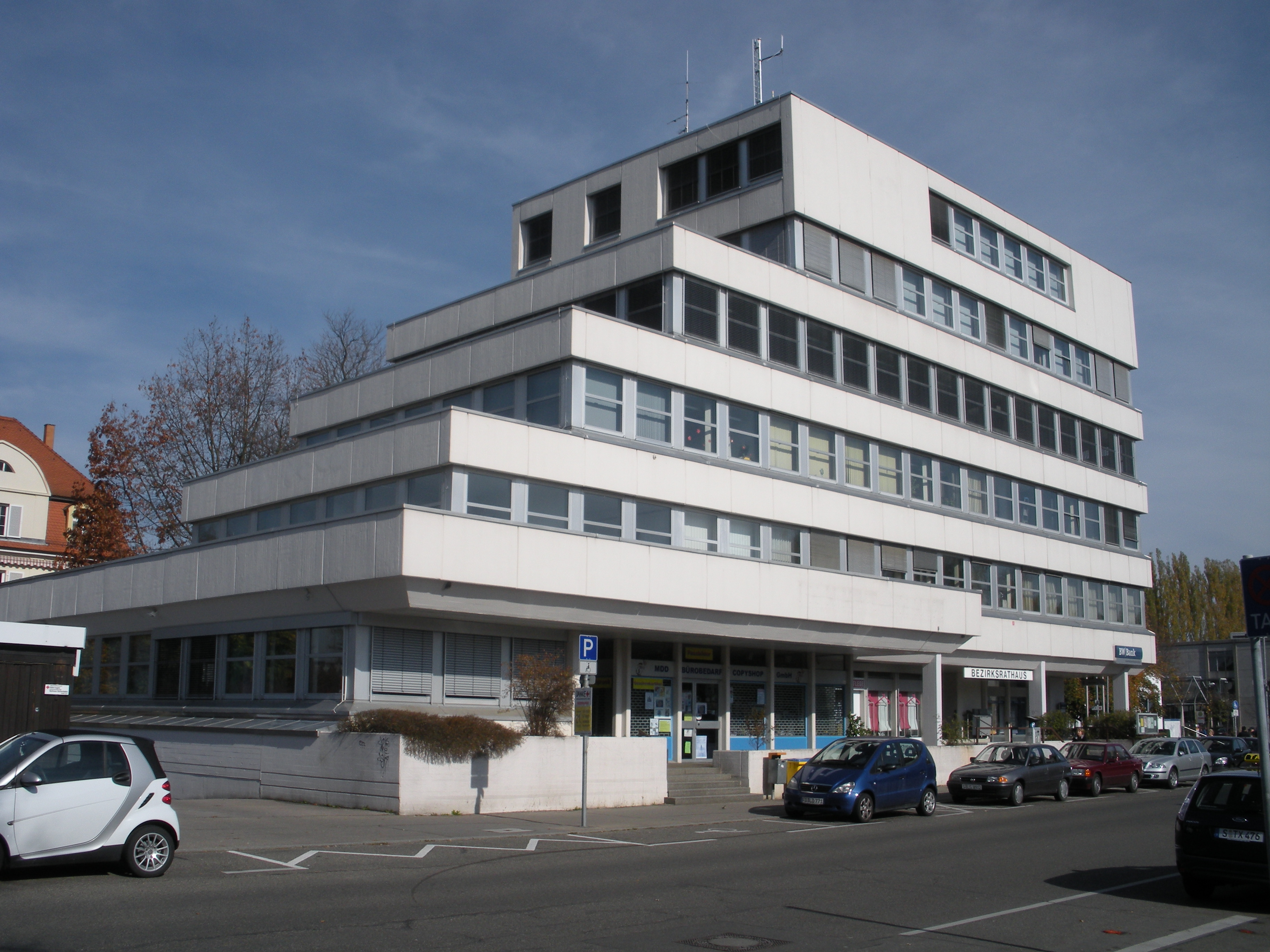
- Town hall

- Coat of arms

- Location within Stuttgart
- Interactive map of Plieningen
- Location within Germany Location within Baden-Württemberg
- Coordinates: 48°42′3.6″N 9°12′38.52″E
- Country: Germany
- State: Baden-Württemberg
- Admin. region: Stuttgart
- District: Stuttgart
- City: Stuttgart
- Founded: April 1, 1942
- Subdivisions: Asemwald, Chausseefeld, Hohenheim, Plieningen, Steckfeld

Government
  - Mayor: Andrea Lindel (CDU)

Area
  - Total: 13.07 km^{2} (5.05 sq mi)
- Elevation: 370 m (1,210 ft)

Population (2020-12-31)
  - Total: 13,325
  - Density: 1,020/km^{2} (2,641/sq mi)
- Time zone: UTC+01:00 (CET)
  - Summer (DST): UTC+02:00 (CEST)
- Postal codes: 70599
- Dialling codes: 0711
- Vehicle registration: S
- Website: www.stuttgart.de/rathaus/stadtbezirke/plieningen/

Plieningen (German pronunciation: [ˈpliːnɪŋən]) is the southernmost borough (Stadtbezirk) of Stuttgart in the state of Baden-Württemberg. Plieningen is located about 10 kilometres (6.2 mi) from the city center of Stuttgart on the Filder Plain. Schloss Hohenheim, part of the Stuttgart Airport, and the parking garage for the Stuttgart Trade Fair are located here.

== Geography ==
Plieningen has five boroughs (Stadtteile) that altogether make up Plieningen's area of 1,307 hectares (13.07 km^{2}).

=== Municipalities ===
No.	Stadtteil	Population (2011)	area
571	Asemwald	1,525	14.2 hectares (0.142 km^{2})
552	Chausseefeld	1,165	6.9 hectares (0.069 km^{2})
581	Hohenheim	575	156.3 hectares (1.563 km^{2})
551	Plieningen	12,512	1,103.9 hectares (11.039 km^{2})
561	Steckfeld	2,147	26.2 hectares (0.262 km^{2})

== History ==
The first settlers in the area appear to have been the Romans, as a Roman column depicting Jupiter was found buried under a farm along the Körsch River. The old military roads (Steinernes Kreuz (German: Stone cross)) were first built by Roman hands.

In AD 600, the first crude iteration of the Church of Saint Martin was constructed here from wood. In the 12th century, one Hugo of Plieningen took the cross and joined the Fourth Crusade, and the device he chose for himself was three white roses on a field of blue, today Plieningen's coat of arms. Starting in the 12th and 13th centuries, the House of Plieningen ruled the town from their nearby castle. The oldest commercial operation of the Plieningens is the Upper Seemühle, which dates back to the 12th century in the Körschtal (German: Körsch valley).

In 1747, the Old Town Hall at Mönchhof was constructed. Later, in 1770, Duke Charles Eugene of Württemberg constructed Schloss Hohenheim from an old moated castle. On April 1, 1942, Plieningen and Birkach were accepted into Stuttgart as districts and neighborhoods.

When the districts of Stuttgart were divided in 1956, Plieningen was divided into three boroughs: Plieningen, Hohenheim, and Steckfeld. In 2001, all five boroughs of Plieningen were established.

== Attractions ==
- Schloss Hohenheim – Old residence of Duke Charles Eugene. Features a zoological museum, and Tiermedizinischem
- University of Hohenheim – Surrounded by the Hohenheim Gardens including the Landesarboretum (German: Exotic garden), the German Agricultural Museum, and the Museum of the History of Hohenheim.
- Heimatmuseum Plieningen – until 2009 at the Old Town Hall, since May 2015 the Zehntscheuer.
- Church of Saint Martin – An early 12th century stone monument of Plieningen.
- Steinernes Kreuz (German: Stone cross) – Neuhauser Street and Echterdinger Road.
- Mönchhof – The old town hall. Now a museum.
- Körschtal (with the Upper and Lower Mill and the Mühlensee) (German: Körsch valley)

== Politics ==
The District Advisory Board of Plieningen operate on the basis of the population of the municipalities of 12 ordinaries and as many alternates. These are the results of the last local elections in 2014:

- CDU: 3
- B90 / Greens: 3
- SPD: 2
- FDP: 1
- AFD: 1

== Transportation ==
Two country roads connect Plieningen to Bundesautobahn 8 (Karlsruhe-Munich), Bundesstraße 27 (Stuttgart-Tübingen), Stuttgart Airport, and the Stuttgart Trade Fair.

Plieningen is the final stop on the U3 line on the Stuttgart Stadtbahn (Plieningen – Möhringen – Vaihingen). It operates on former Stuttgart-Möhringen Stuttgart-Hohenheim line and was opened in 1888 by the Filderbahn Society.

== Sports ==
Turnverein Plieningen 1873, founded in 1873, has about 1300 members including about 900 in the gymnastics department.

== Notable residents ==
- Helisaeus Roeslin (1545–1616) – Physician, astrologer, and geographer chronologist
- Christian Gottlieb Göz (1746–1803) – Pastor in Plieningen and Hohenheim

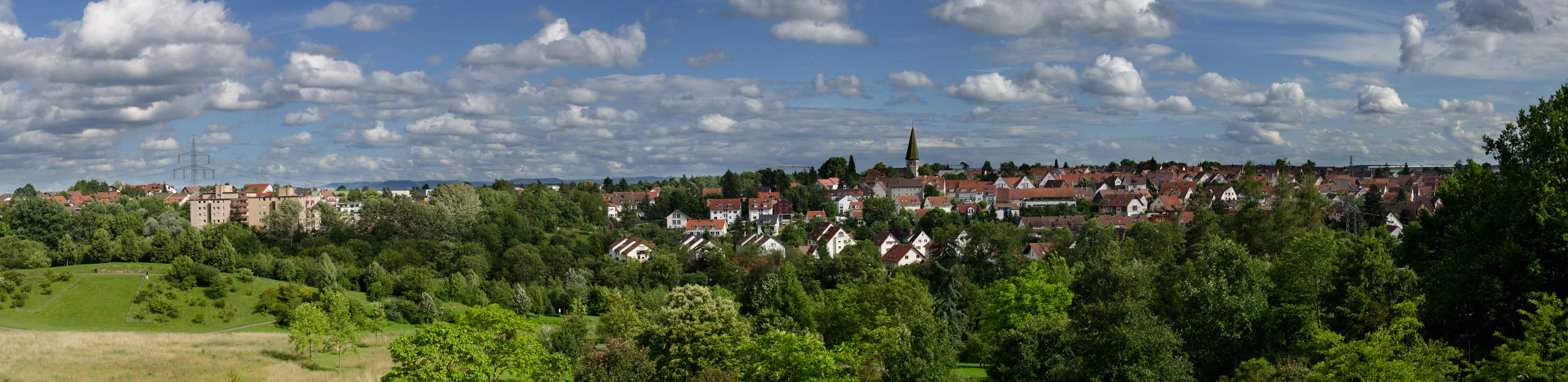
Plieningen, circa 2011. Note Saint Martin's Church in the center
