= Schloss Kirchheim (Teck) =

German palace

Kirchheim Palace
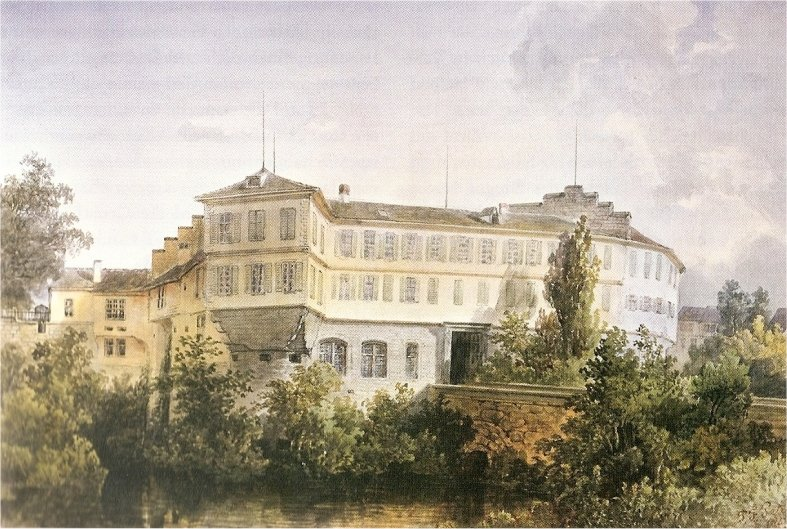
- 1851 watercolor of the palace

Map location and basic information
Location within Baden-Württemberg Location within Germany
General information
Location	Kirchheim unter Teck, Germany
Coordinates	48°38′50″N 09°26′58″E
Owner	Baden-Württemberg

Website
- www.schloss-kirchheim.de/en/home/

Schloss Kirchheim is a castle and palace in the old town of Kirchheim unter Teck, in the German state of Baden-Württemberg. The palace was built in the 16th century by Ulrich, Duke of Württemberg as a castle and part of a greater system of defensive works. Over two centuries later, it became the dower house for the Duchy and later Kingdom of Württemberg. The palace's interior is currently arranged and furnished as it was during the residence of its final dowager, Henriette von Nassau-Weilburg.

== History ==
On his return from exile, Duke Ulrich of Württemberg ordered the construction of seven fortresses across the Duchy of Württemberg in order to better protect its territory. Those fortresses were to be the castles of Hohentübingen, Hohenurach, Hohenneuffen, Hohenasperg and Hohentwiel, and the towns of Schorndorf and Kirchheim unter Teck.

Construction of Kirchheim's complex of fortifications began in 1538, and with resources assembled from across the Duchy. This complex was made up deep moats, robust bastions, ramparts, and, at its southwest corner, a castle. This castle was to be the most important part of the complex, acting as a last line of defense and commanding two gates. Ulrich's son and successor, Duke Christoph, completed construction on the complex with the addition of a 75 meters (246 ft) series of casemates called the Erdenberg. This formed a zwinger and base for wall-mounted artillery.

=== Palace ===
Over the 17th century, the castle's military importance, and even appearance, eroded. The Dukes of Württemberg began to use it as a jagdschloss, or as a dower house when required, and laid out gardens around it. Underscoring all this, in 1688, during the Nine Years' War, Dowager Duchess Maria Dorothea Sophia von Oettingen secured Kirchheim's protection from destruction by French troops from General Joseph de Montclar. Duke Eberhard Louis's wife, Johanna von Baden-Durlach, moved into Kirchheim Palace in 1735 rather than Leonberg Castle, and she made some modest revisions to the residence.

In the mid-18th century, Duke Charles Eugene in particular made use of Kirchheim Palace and Stuttgart's Schloss Solitude for his hunting trips. His visits to Kirchheim unter Teck were accompanied by retinues of over 400 people who found lodging and services with the town's people. In 1767, Charles Eugene converted the palace's plant nursery into an opera house. Four years later, in 1771, Charles Eugene led a 411-person retinue to Kirchheim for the autumn hunt. Among them was his Chamblerin, the Baron von Leutrum, and his young wife, Franziska von Hohenheim. Charles Eugene fell in love with Franziska over the trip and ended his relationship with his mistress, Catharina Bonafini. Charles Eugene made Franziska his new mistress months later, then later married the Duke in 1785. The two built Hohenheim Palace, which was deeded to Franziska by Charles Eugene in 1772, but when the Duke died in 1791, this was not respected. Charles Eugene's successor, his brother Louis Eugene, also did not recognize Franzisk's status as Dowager Duchess. As such, Franziska was divested of Hohenheim Palace and, in 1795, was exiled to Kirchheim Palace in 1795 without much of her inventory. Finding Kirchheim Palace not to her taste, Franziska tasked Charles Eugene's court architect, Reinhard Heinrich Ferdinand Fischer, with modernizing the palace while she furnished it with what she could bring from Solitude and Hohenheim Palaces. Franziska led a quiet, and at times monotonous, life at Kirchheim and died there on 1 January 1811.

In 1810, the reigning King Frederick I exiled his brother Louis and his family to Kirchheim for Louis's expensive lifestyle and outstanding debts. Louis, his wife Henriette von Nassau-Weilburg, and their five children moved into the palace in 1811 and were to live austerely. Louis's death in 1817 freed the family, and allowed Henriette to renovate the palace once again. Henriette also became very involved in the municipal community after Louis's death, establishing vocational schools and orphanages, and organizing outreach programs. After Henriette's own death in 1857, her furnishings were auctioned off, and all palatial residents except for the groundskeeper left.

In 1922, the municipal history museum moved into the palace's chapel. Under the Nazis, this was turned over to and used by the Nazi Party. After 1947, the palace housed a teacher's college and learning center.

Kirchheim Castle is one of the monuments and maintained by the heritage agency Staatliche Schlösser und Gärten Baden-Württemberg. The grand living spaces on the south side of the second floor are set up as a palace museum and are open to the public. They are dedicated to the last two residents, Franziska and Henriette. Most of Franziska's furniture has been preserved, and this allowed the state of the castle during Franziska's days to be restored when the castle was reconditioned in 1985 and 1997.

== Grounds and architecture ==
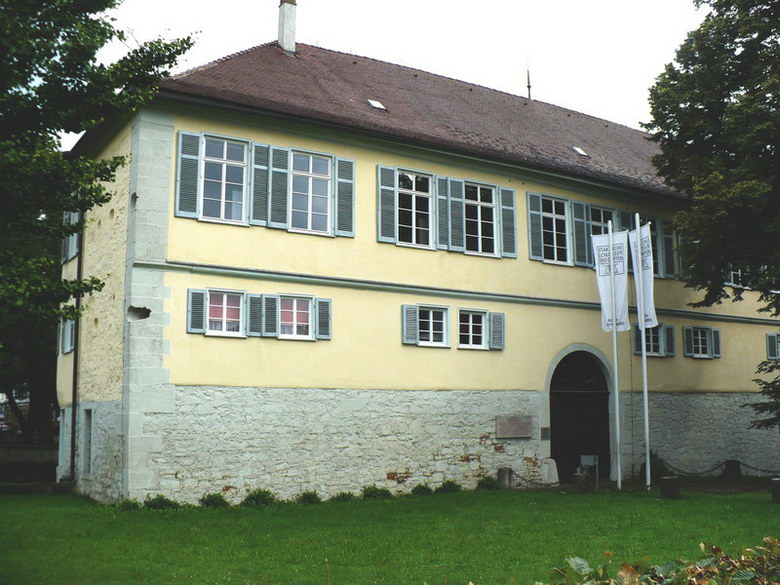
Renaissance castle

Kirchheim Palace was remodeled frequently throughout its usage as a dower house by its residents. The first of these was for Franziska von Hohenheim who, in the 1790s, tasked Reinhard Heinrich Ferdinand Fischer with the expansion of the castle into a palace. Fischer added a garden and two new rooms on the casemates. The final remodeling was by Henriette von Nassau-Weilburg, and it is this arrangement and decor that presently exists at Kirchheim Palace.

The building has an irregular diamond shape with four wings, and a deep moat. The suite for the resident dowager was the apartment on the third floor of the south wing. Past the corner tower, where the dining room is found, is an enfilade of 13 rooms in two rows, separated by a servants' passage. The first of these rooms, just off the stairs and spanning the width of the building, is the summer dining hall. This room was very important to the social life of the resident dowagers. Henriette von Nassau-Weilburg converted the hall into an antechamber while its functions moved into the octagonal tower.

Under Franziska von Hohenheim, the dowager suite was made up of an enfilade of six rooms on its south side, and five rooms, hall, and a staircase on its north end. The southern portion was later expanded with two rooms, the Garden Rooms, built from wood which was then on top of a casemate. A watercolor painting made 14 years after Franziska's death show the walls as being covered by blue wallpaper with white curtains. Henriette von Nassau had the floors covered with vibrant carpets and new furniture, and covered the walls with new wallpaper and framed paintings. Henriette also had the Garden Room rebuilt in brick to make it habitable in the winter, and filled it with keepsakes.

Kirchheim Palace has had several gardens. The first was laid out when the castle became a hunting retreat, but was erased by the construction of a rail line in the 19th century. Franziska von Hohenheim arranged a new garden between the stable and palace, and built a greenhouse there in 1797, but Henriette von Nassau rearranged it into an English landscape garden. Henriette laid out another two gardens where the north-west moat had been and in front of the Garden Rooms.

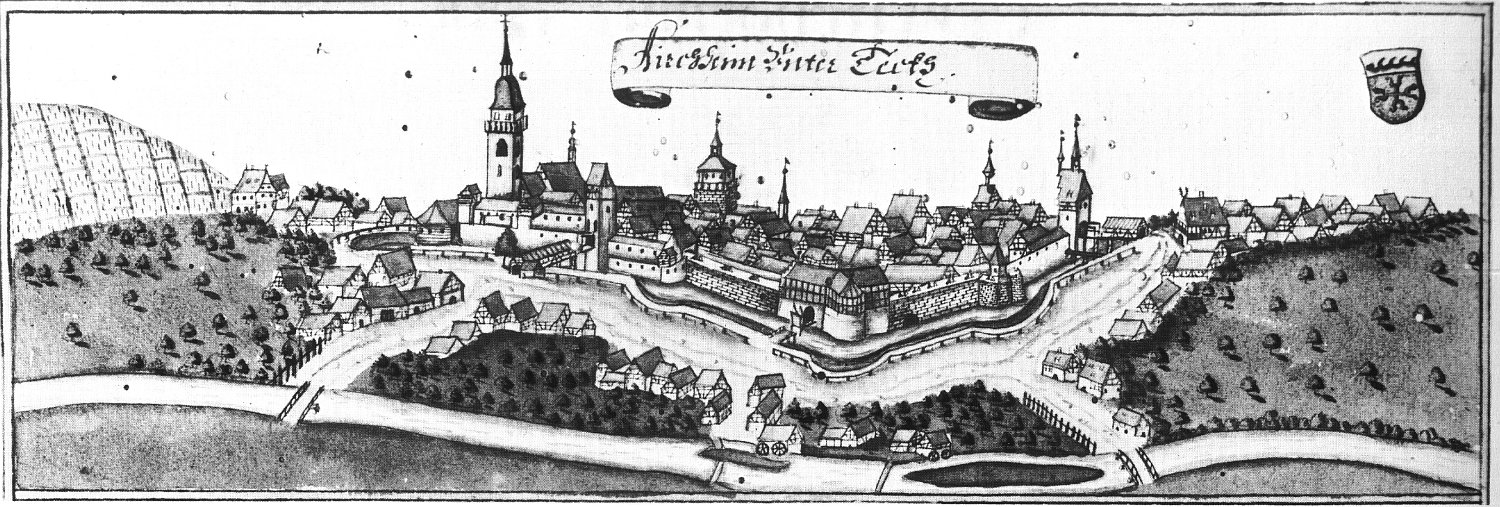
Kirchheim Castle about 1683, here seen at the center of the city wall

== See also ==
- List of castles in Baden-Württemberg
