= Hohenheim =

- Quarter of Stuttgart
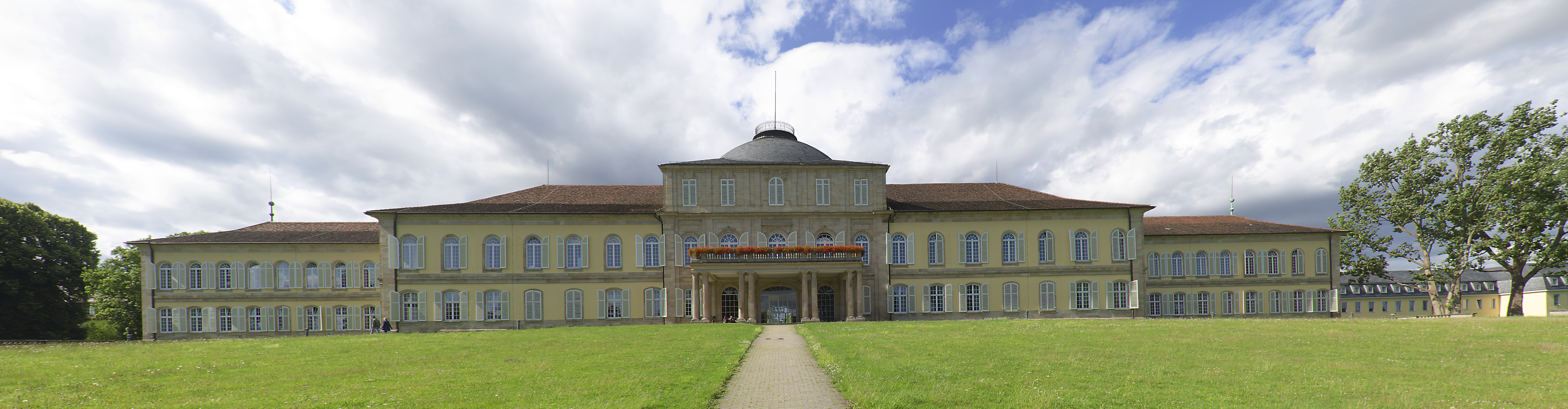
- Schloss Hohenheim

- Location within Stuttgart
- Interactive map of Hohenheim
- Location within Germany Location within Baden-Württemberg
- Coordinates: 48°42′42″N 9°12′41″E
- Country: Germany
- State: Baden-Württemberg
- Admin. region: Stuttgart
- District: Urban district
- City: Stuttgart
- Borough: Plieningen
- Founded: 1782

Area
  - Total: 1.563 km^{2} (0.603 sq mi)

Population (2020-12-31)
  - Total: 575
  - Density: 368/km^{2} (953/sq mi)
- Time zone: UTC+01:00 (CET)
  - Summer (DST): UTC+02:00 (CEST)
- Postal codes: 70599
- Dialling codes: 0711

Hohenheim (German pronunciation: [ˈhoːənhaɪm]) is one of 18 outer quarters of the city of Stuttgart in the borough of Plieningen that sits on the Filder in central Baden-Württemberg. It was founded in 1782.

== Geography ==
Hohenheim sits on the Filder, a large and fertile plateau in the center of Baden-Württemberg. Hohenheim forms the Plieningen Municipality of Stuttgart along with Asemwald, Chausseefeld, Plieningen and Steckfeld.

The quarter was founded in 1782 when Schloss Hohenheim was constructed on the orders of Charles Eugene of Baden-Württemberg. The University of Hohenheim, as the name might imply, is based here and uses much of Schloss Hohenheim for its campus.

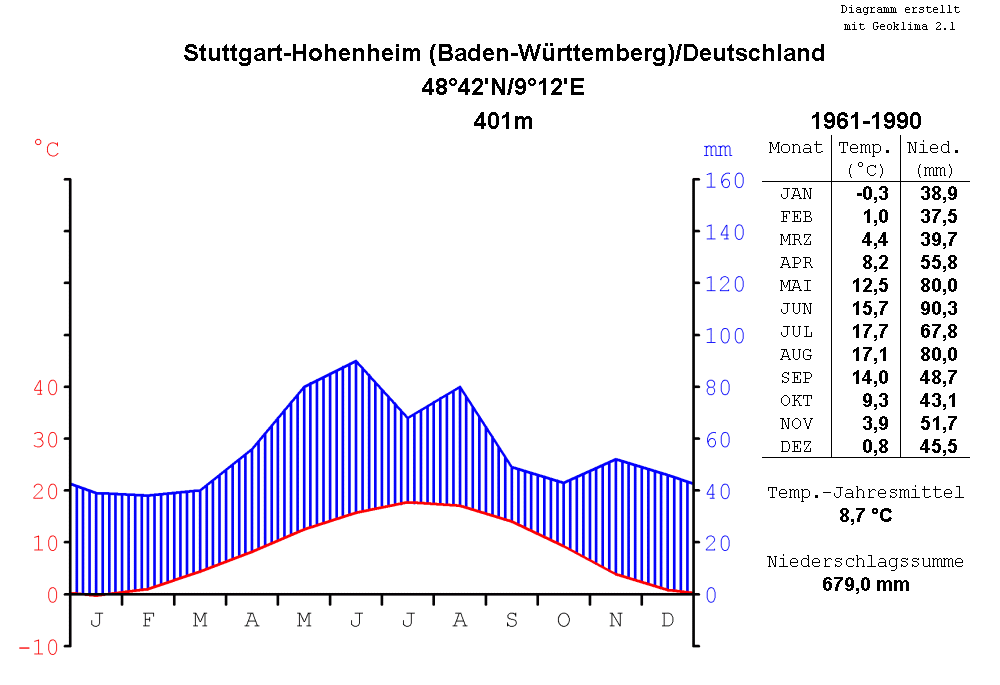
Climate chart of Stuttgart-Hohenheim 1961–1990

== History ==
After the duke had acquired the former manor of the Bombast von Hohenheim family in 1768, he gave it to his mistress Franziska Leutrum von Ertingen, including the title of a Reichsgräfin von Hohenheim. From 1772 Karl Eugen had the manor house rebuilt as a water castle surrounded by an extended English garden featuring several midget replicas of historic buildings, an arboretum and numerous exotic plants. The construction of the present-day palace started in 1782 but discontinued with the duke's death in 1793.

In 1818 King William I of Württemberg established an agricultural school at Hohenheim, the predecessor of today's university. Today the gardens comprise the Landesarboretum Baden-Württemberg and the Botanischer Garten der Universität Hohenheim.

== Transportation ==
From 1888 to 1967, Hohenheim was tethered to the Möhringen-Hohenheim tracks by local railroads. Today, Hohenheim serves as the final stop of the U3 line of the Stuttgart Stadtbahn (Plieningen – Möhringen – Vaihingen). The track of rail that did connect Schloss Hohenheim is decommissioned. The town (and university) is equipped with buses and streetcars that can take one to the Schloss or Degerloch.

== Famous residents ==
- Hermann Eckstein (1847–1893), German-South African mining magnate and banker
- Erwin Mack (1893–1942), Major General
- Erich Spring (1903-1997), District Officer in Tettnang
- Paracelsus (1494–1541), Swiss physician, alchemist and astrologer
