= Aischbach =

Aischbach may refer to:

- Aischbach (Kinzig), a river of Baden-Württemberg, Germany, tributary of the Kinzig
- Aischbach (Körsch), a river of Baden-Württemberg, Germany, left headstream of the Körsch
