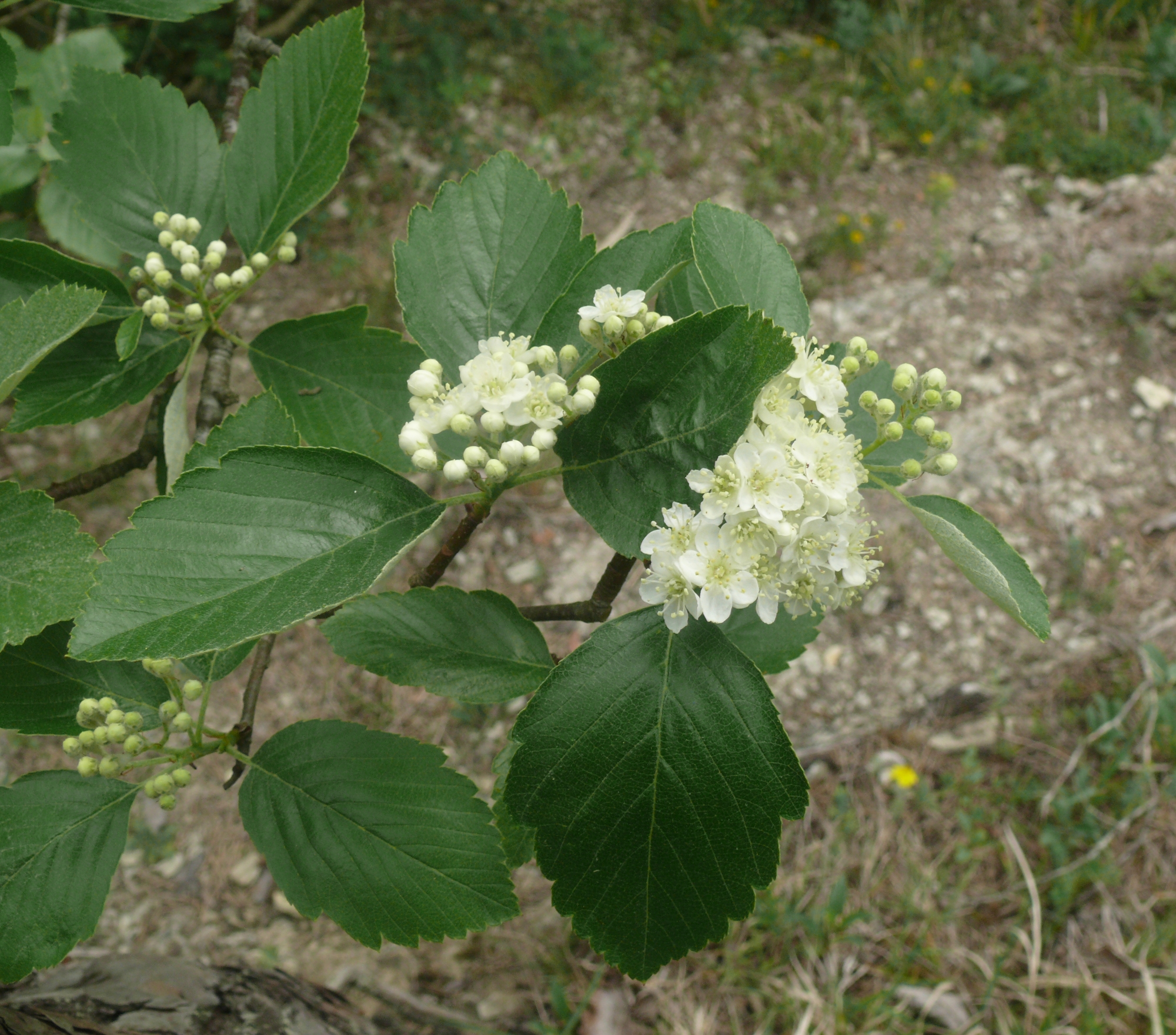
- Flowering Aria seyboldiana growing in the Tauberland, Germany

Conservation status
- Critically Endangered (IUCN 3.1)

Scientific classification
- Kingdom: Plantae
- Clade: Tracheophytes
- Clade: Angiosperms
- Clade: Eudicots
- Clade: Rosids
- Order: Rosales
- Family: Rosaceae
- Genus: Aria
- Species: A. seyboldiana

Binomial name
- Aria seyboldiana (S.Hammel & Haynold) Mosyakin, Fedor. & McNeill
- It is endemic to Baden-Württemberg and Bavaria, Germany

Synonyms
- Karpatiosorbus seyboldiana (S.Hammel & Haynold) Sennikov & Kurtto; Pyrus seyboldiana (S.Hammel & Haynold) M.F.Fay & Christenh.; Sorbus seyboldiana S.Hammel & Haynold

= Aria seyboldiana =

Species of tree

Aria seyboldiana, or Seybold's whitebeam, is an apomictic species of tree in the family Rosaceae endemic to Baden-Württemberg and Bavaria, Germany. It is extremely rare and threatened with extinction. It is believed to have arisen by hybridisation of Aria graeca s.l. and Aria torminalis.

== Description ==
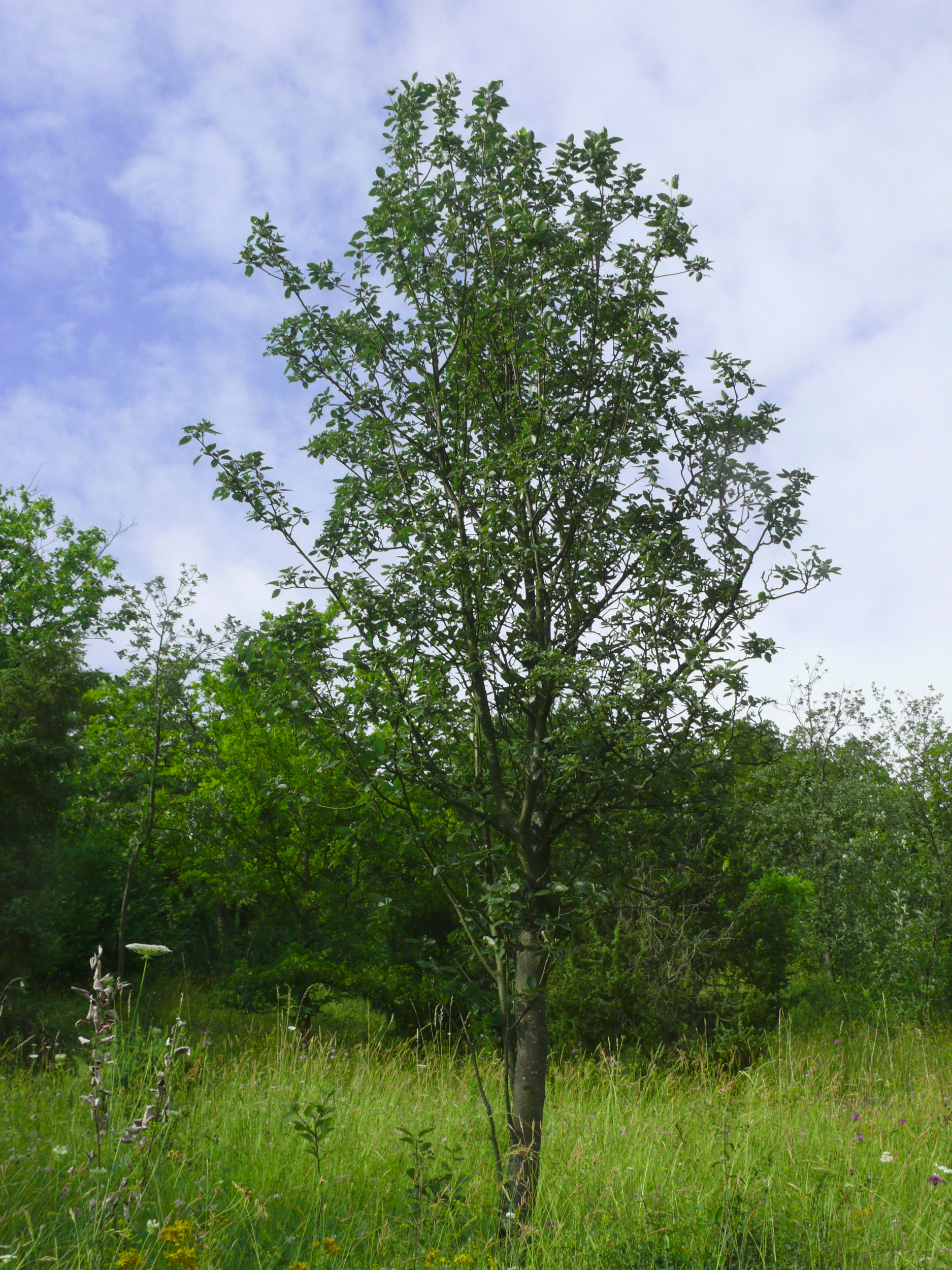
Aria seyboldiana tree growing in Bavaria, Germany

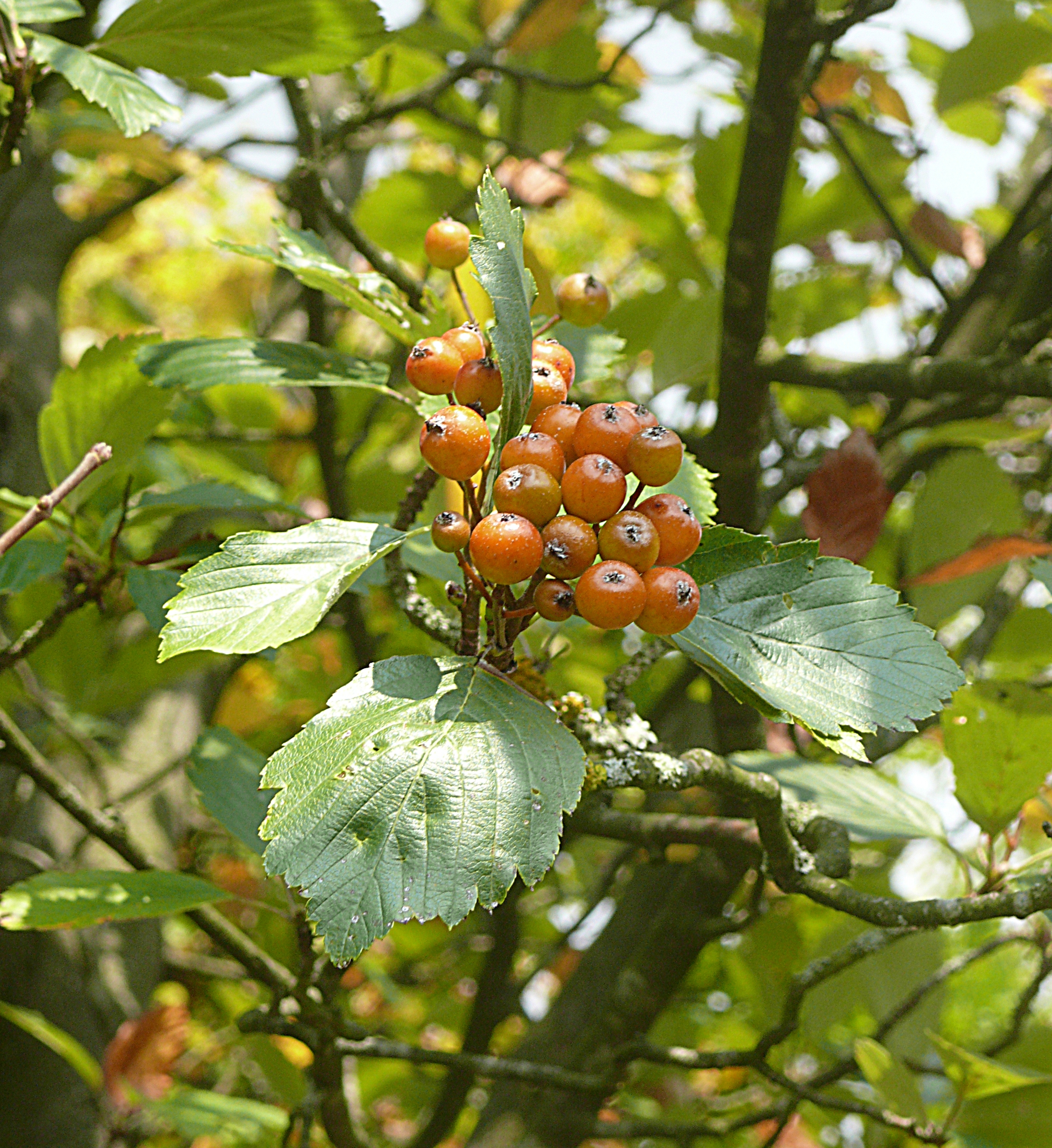
Fruiting Aria seyboldiana

=== Vegetative characteristics ===
Aria seyboldiana is an up to 10(–20) m tall tree with a trunk circumference of up to 64 cm at the height of 150 cm. The initially smooth and later fissured bark is greyish brown.

=== Generative characteristics ===
The (2.8–)4.5–6(–7) cm wide inflorescence bears 20–25(–27) pedicellate, white, 1.6–1.8 cm wide flowers. The androecium is composed of 20 white, 4–6 mm long stamens with cream or faintly green anthers. The ovary with white pubescence bears 2 glabrous, faintly green, basally fused, 3.5 mm long styles with glabrous stigmas. The elliptic to globose fruit bears 1(–2) brown, 5 mm long, 3 mm wide, and 2 mm high seeds.

=== Cytology ===
It is triploid with a chromosome count of 2n = 51.

== Taxonomy ==
It was first described as Sorbus seyboldiana S.Hammel & Haynold by Steffen Hammel and Bernd Haynold in 2015. It was moved to the genus Aria (Pers.) J.Jacq. ex Host as Aria seyboldiana (S.Hammel & Haynold) Mosyakin, Fedor. & McNeill by Sergei Leonidovich Mosyakin, Mykola Mykhaylovych Fedoronchuk, and John McNeill in 2025. The type specimen, which is held in the State Museum of Natural History Stuttgart, was collected on the 19th of June 2014 by Hammel and Haynold southeast of Werbachhausen, Baden-Württemberg, Germany on a former sheep pasture at an altitude of 235 m above lea level. It was first documented by Andreas Kneucker in the forest near Werbachhausen in Baden-Württemberg, Germany on the 19th of June 1945.

=== Etymology ===
The specific epithet seyboldiana honours Siegmund Gerhard Seybold.

== Distribution and habitat ==
It occurs in grassland, forests, and transitional zones between these habitats at 200–330 m above sea level in Baden-Württemberg and Bavaria, Germany. The largest part of its population occurs in the Welzbachtal, a side valley of the Taubertal, near Werbachhausen, Baden-Württemberg, Germany.

== Conservation ==
It is a critically endangered species with a restricted distribution. It is of very high importance in terms of nature conservation and is included in the red list of Bavaria and Baden-Württemberg. It occurs within three nature reserves, but two of the reserves only have one tree each, while the third has the remaining 16 individuals. It is cultivated in the Hohenheim Gardens.

== Uses ==
Aria seyboldiana may have been used as firewood.
