= Einsiedel Palace =

Former pleasure palace of duke Charles Eugene of Württemberg

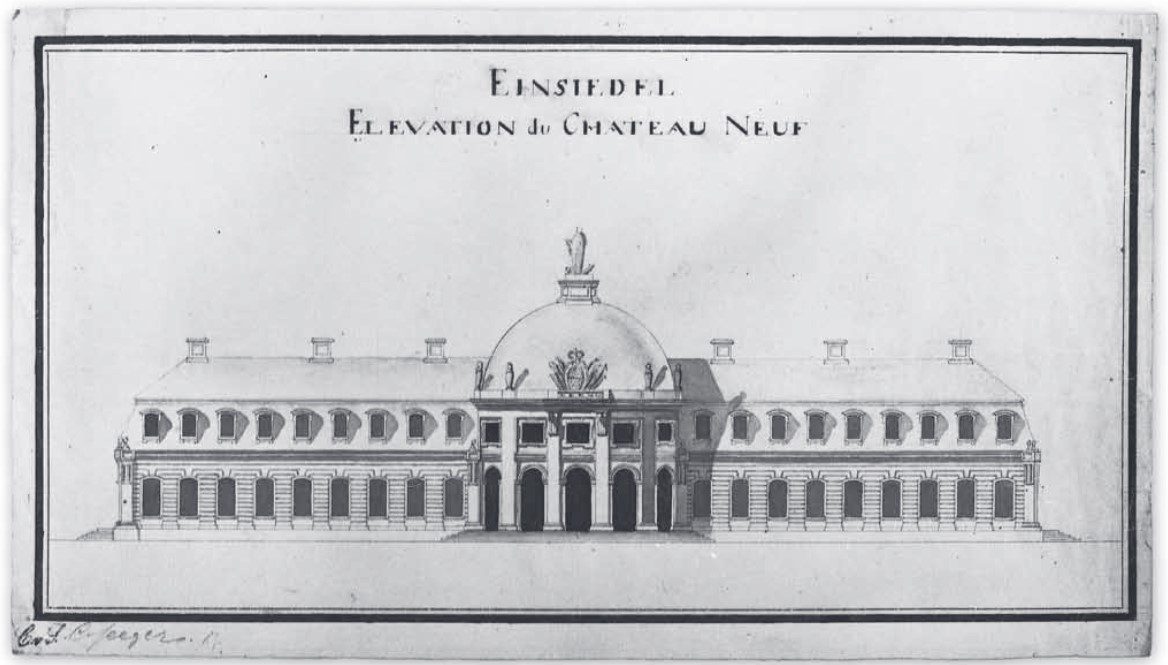
Einsiedel Palace

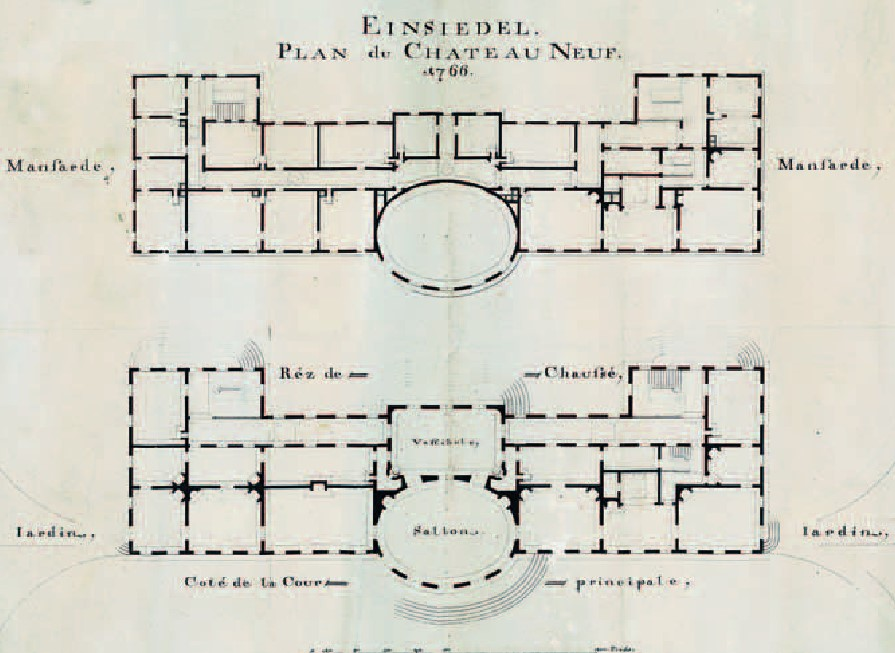
Design plan of Einsiedel Palace from 1766

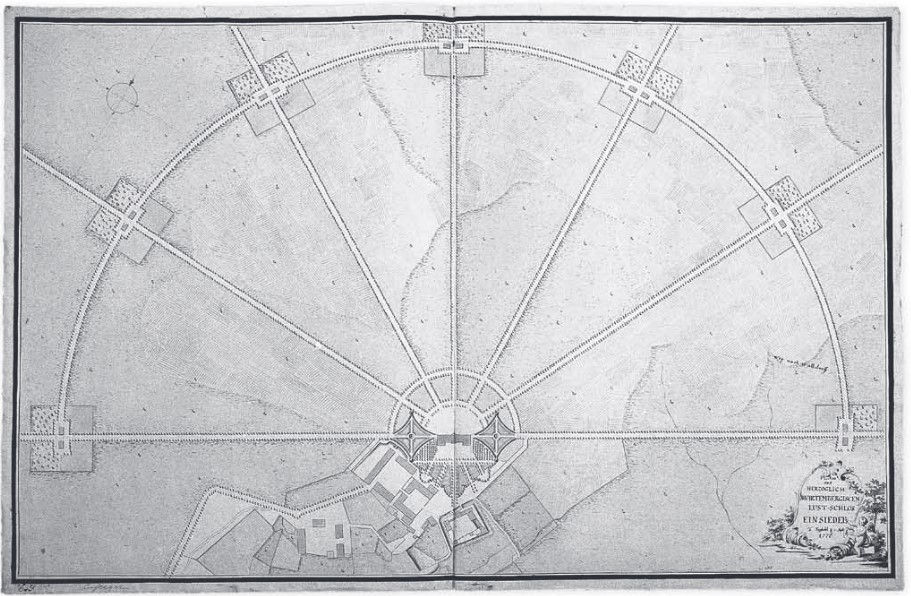
Plan of Einsiedel Palace and Park by T Seybold in 1776

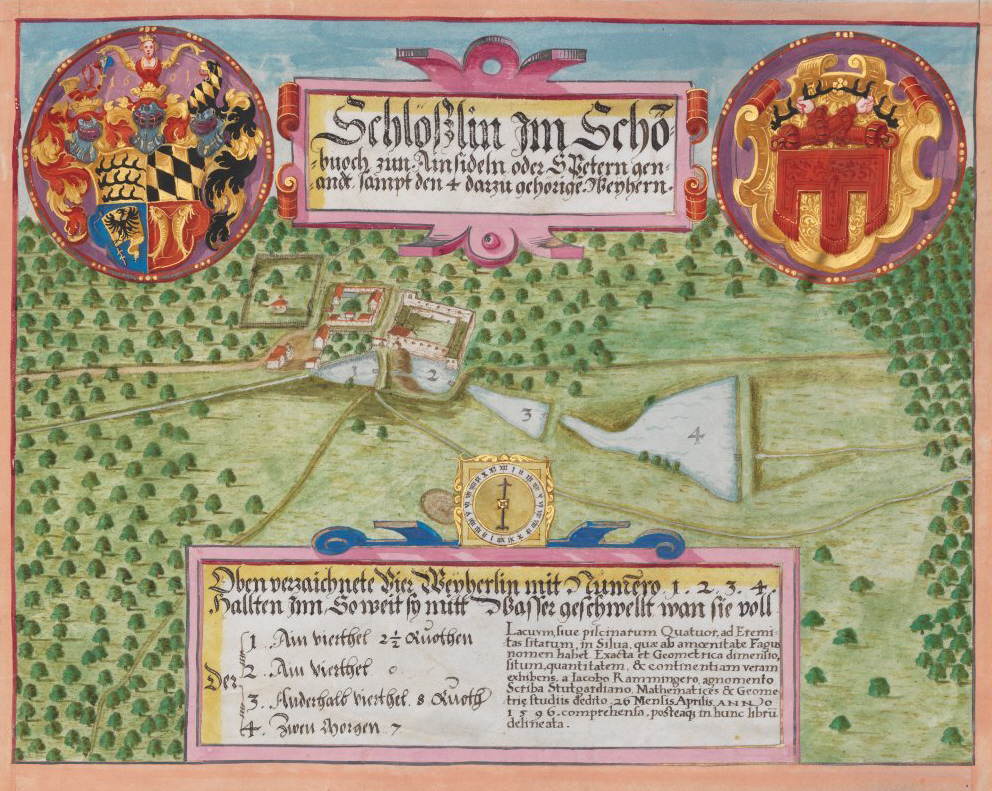
View of the renaissance Einsiedel estate

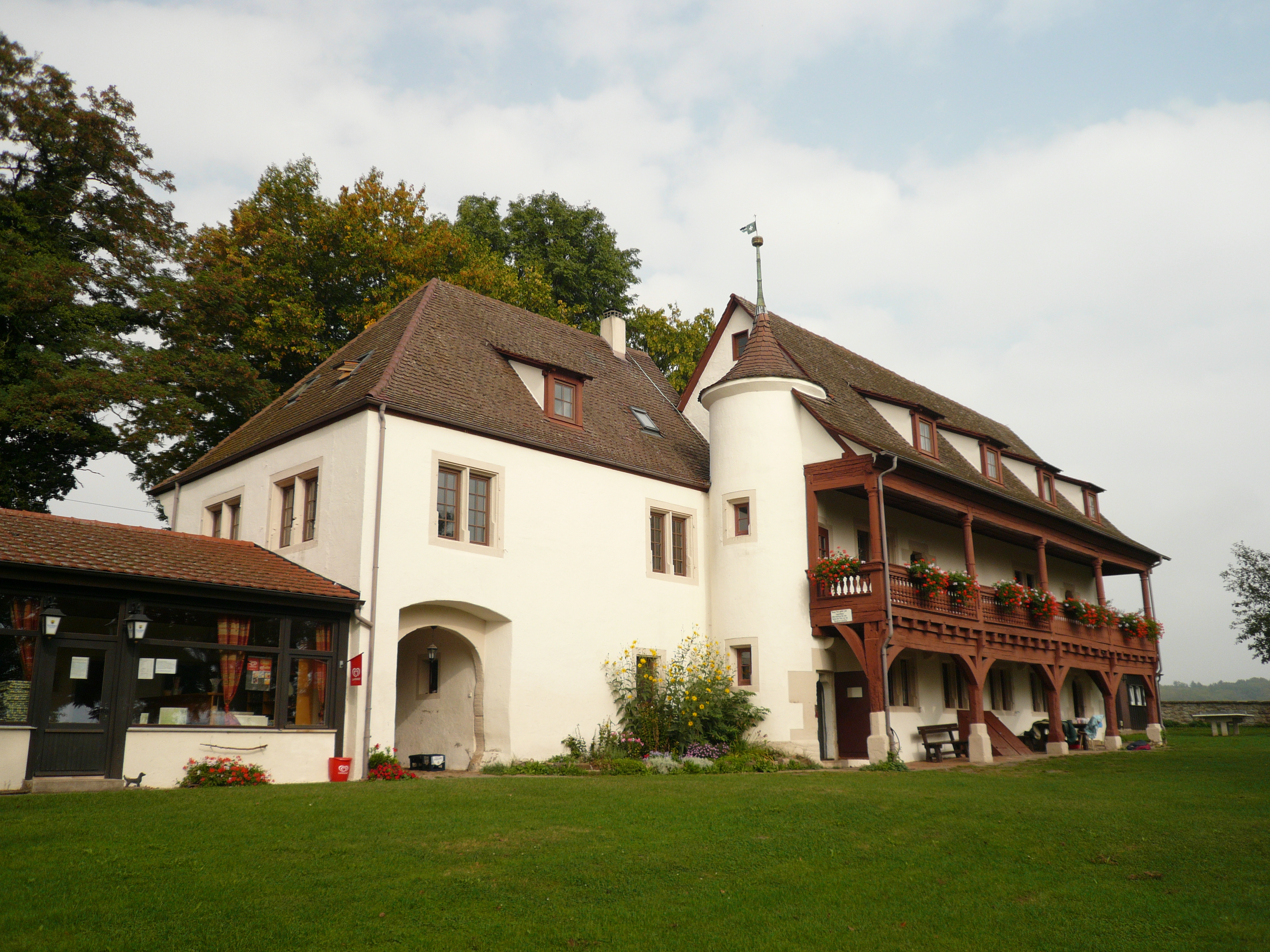
Remaining wing of the medieval hunting lodge

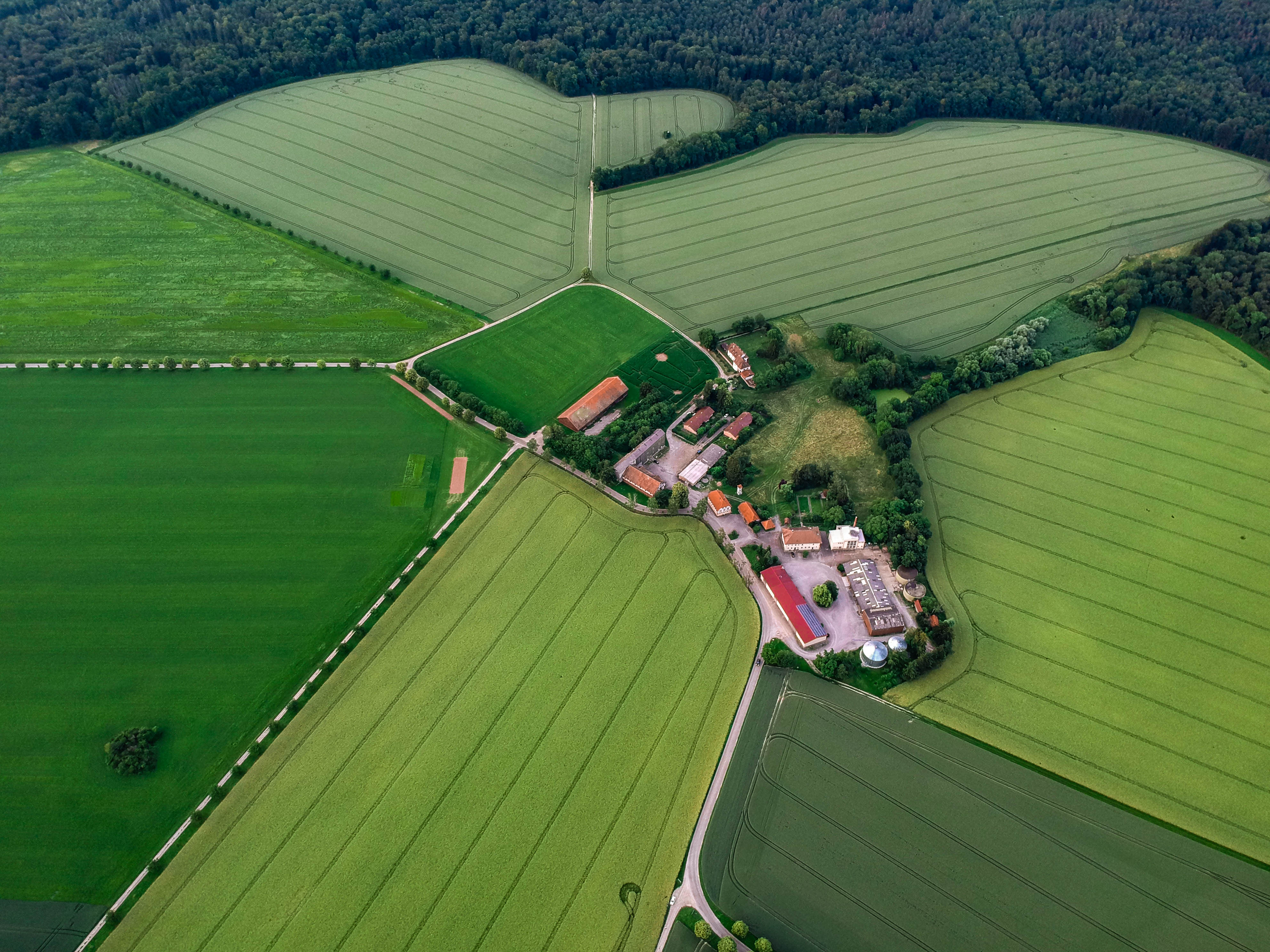
Einsiedel from the air, you can still see the avenues which were directed to the palace

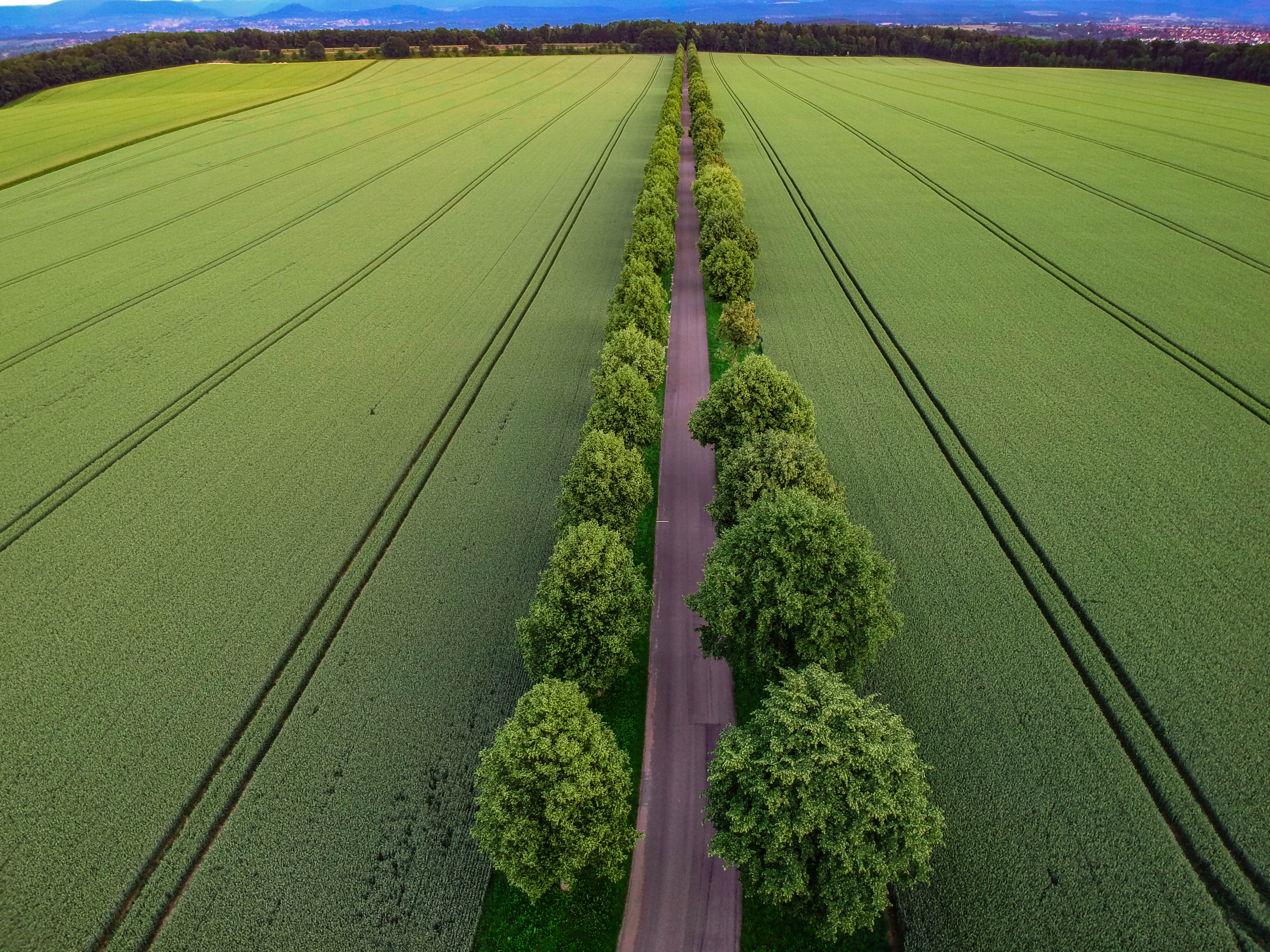
The avenue from Einsiedel to Kirchentellinsfurt

Einsiedel Palace (German: Schloss Einsiedel) was a Rococo schloss and hunting retreat commissioned by Charles Eugene, Duke of Württemberg. It was constructed between 1767 and 1772. Around 1804, the palace was demolished. It was located at the edge of the Schönbuch forest, north of the village of Kirchentellinsfurt, near Tübingen, Baden-Württemberg in Germany.

== History ==
As of the second half of the 15th century, the Einsiedel estate was owned by the House of Württemberg. Count Eberhard V (Eberhard im Bart, 1445–1496), later the first Duke of Württemberg, and founder of the University of Tübingen, established a stud farm in Einsiedel around 1460. The location at the edge of the forest was also suitable for a hunting lodge, which was constructed in 1480.

Einsiedel fell into a deep sleep until the second half of the 18th century. Charles Eugene (1728–1793) had become the duke of Württemberg. His reign was marked by economic difficulty, political strife and extravagance. He was a great lover of architecture, and (re)constructed many palaces in and near Ludwigsburg and Stuttgart. Around 1750, he ordered the construction of new buildings for the stud farm. Construction of the palace started around 1767. The exterior was ready after two years, and the interior was finished in 1772.

Contrary to the main residence, the pleasure palaces were constructed in a half-timbered fashion. This enabled rapid construction and saved costs, which was a welcome argument, as duke Charles Eugene constructed many palaces. Einsiedel palace consisted of one main story, with a mansard floor above. The ducal apartments were on the west side of the palace. Little is known how the interior looked like.

Already during his reign, duke Charles Eugene lost interest in Einsiedel palace. In 1790, a visitor noted ‘It is somewhat furnished but uninhabited, and hasn't been visited by his Serene Highness, who often used to stay here for hunting, for a long time.’ In 1804, duke Frederick I of Württemberg (1754–1816), later the first king of Württemberg, decided to demolish the Einsiedel palace.

Today, nothing remains of the palace. One can only recognize the star-shaped avenues, which were laid around the palace. Also, one wing remains of the medieval hunting lodge, which as from 1964 serves as a catholic youth facility centre (German: Jugendhaus). The estate is still owned by the ducal house of Württemberg, and is used for agricultural purposes.

== See also: Other palaces owned and (re)constructed by duke Charles Eugene ==
- New Palace (Stuttgart)
- Grafeneck Castle
- Hohenheim Palace
- Ludwigsburg Palace
- Monrepos Palace
- Solitude Palace

== Literature ==
- Schiek, Siegwalt (1982). Der Einsiedel bei Tübingen. Seine Geschichte und seine Bauten (in German). Sigmaringen: Thorbecke Verlag. ISBN 3-7995-4043-1.
- Fleck, Walther-Gerd (1986). Grafeneck und Einsiedel: zwei Lustschlösser des Herzogs Carl Eugen von Württemberg (in German). Walther-Gerd Fleck. p. 32.
- Kotzurek, Annegret (2001). 'Von den Zimmern bey Hof'. Funktion, Disposition und Ausstattung der herzoglich-württembergischen Schlösser zur Regierungszeit Carl Eugens (1737–1793) (in German). Berlin.
- Heusel, Andreas; Maier, Peter (2018). Der Einsiedel im Schönbuch. Stiftskirche, Schloss und Hofgut (in German). Kirchentellinsfurt: Gemeinde Kirchentellinsfurt. ISBN 978-3-00-060109-5.
- Tuchen, Birgit (2019). "Schlossallee und Lustgarten Barocke (Landschafts-)Architektur auf dem Einsiedel bei Tübingen". Denkmalpflege in Baden-Württemberg (in German). 4: 262–268.
