= Landesarboretum Baden-Württemberg =

Coordinates: 48.7083°N 9.2087°E

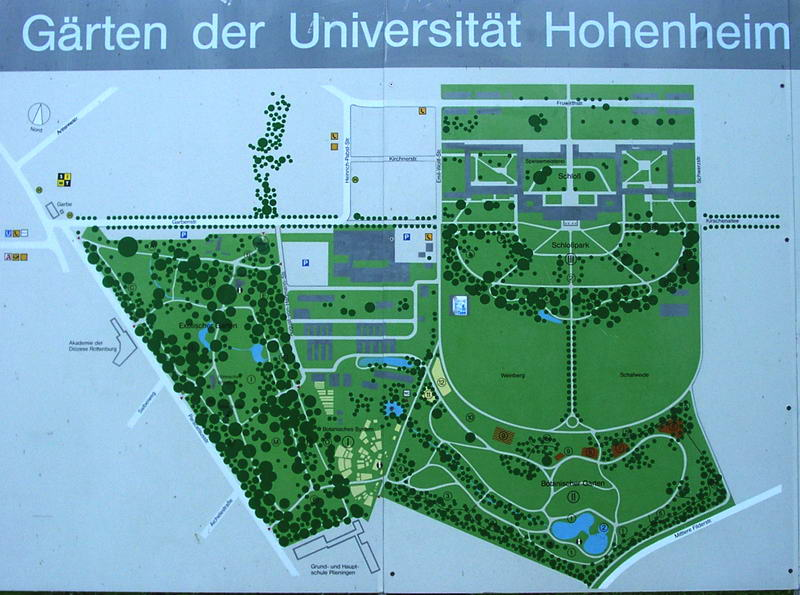
University of Hohenheim gardens, with the Exotischer Garten at left. The newer Hohenheimer Landschaftsgarten is not shown.

The Landesarboretum Baden-Württemberg (16.5 hectares) is a historic arboretum and part of the Hohenheim Gardens maintained by the University of Hohenheim, on Garbenstrasse in the Hohenheim district of Stuttgart, Baden-Württemberg, Germany.

The arboretum was begun as a landscape garden in the years 1776–1793 by Karl Eugen, Duke of Württemberg, on a site southwest of Schloss Hohenheim. It contained two major collections - a botanical garden of plants from the Württemberg region, and an arboretum of North American trees (the Exotischer Garten) - which by 1783 contained a total of 120 species. After the Duke's death in 1793, the garden was opened to the public, and during the nineteenth and early twentieth centuries was used for cultivation of seedlings for the Duke's gardens, study of exotic trees for local forestry, and student botanical studies.

The garden suffered substantial losses in 1930–31, after which its nursery was demolished and the garden returned to approximately its original state. In 1953 the former Exotischer Garten became the Landesarboretum Baden-Württemberg. Its collections were substantially enhanced beginning in 1996 when an adjacent 7.4 hectares were devoted to a new Hohenheimer Landschaftsgarten (Hohenheimer Landscape Garden), with first trees were planted in 1997 and an additional 200 plants added in 1998. Plantings have continued since.

Today's arboretum comprises two linked sections, the old Exotischer Garten and the newer Hohenheimer Landschaftsgarten. Together they contain about 2450 taxa of deciduous and coniferous woody plants, representing 270 species from over 90 plant families. Particularly noteworthy are historic specimens dating to the arboretum's creation, including tulip trees planted in 1779, oaks (1790), and yellow buckeye (1799).

== See also ==
- Hohenheim Gardens
- List of botanical gardens in Germany
