= Sindelbach (Körsch) =

River in Germany

Location
- Country: Germany
- State: Baden-Württemberg

Physical characteristics
- Mouth
  - location: Körsch
  - coordinates: 48.7244°N 9.1488°E

Basin features
- Progression: Körsch→ Neckar→ Rhine→ North Sea

The Sindelbach is a river of Baden-Württemberg, Germany. It is the right headstream of the Körsch, in Möhringen, a district of Stuttgart.

== See also ==
- List of rivers of Baden-Württemberg
