= Bombast von Hohenheim =

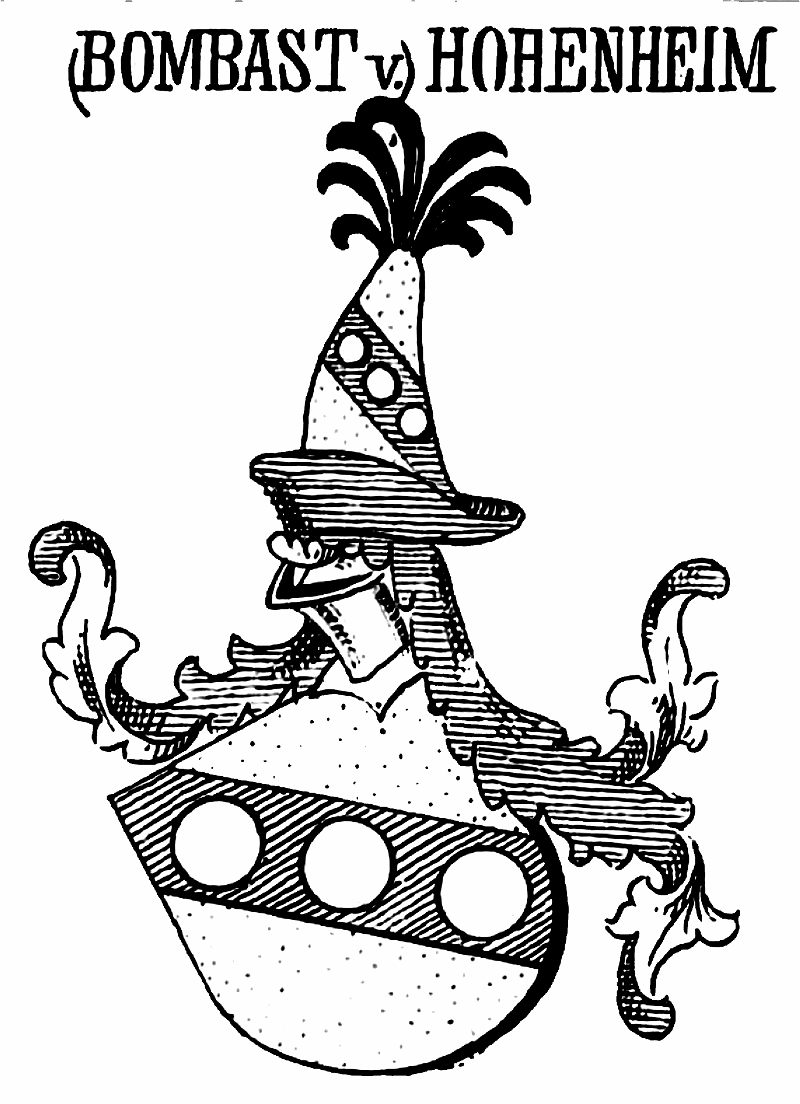
Coat of arms of Bombast von Hohenheim family

Bombast von Hohenheim was a Swabian noble family from the 12th century, named for their seat, Hohenheim Castle, which they held as a fief from the Counts of Württemberg. Their coat of arms was blazoned Or on a bend azure three roundels argent.

The first mention of the family is in 1120, when one Egilolf von Hohenheim made a donation to Hirsau Abbey. One Cunradus de Hohenheim miles cognomine Bambast ("Conrad von Hohenheim, knight, also called Bambast) is mentioned in 1270 (donation to Herrenalb Abbey). But the von Hohenheim did not regularly use the byname Bombast until the time of Hans Bombast von Hohenheim (attested between 1342 and 1404).

Bambast (or bambest, bamst) is recorded as a Central German field name (of a wooded area) but the name Bombast has in modern times also been associated with "cotton", etymologized as German Baumbast (properly "the fibrous layer of a tree's bark").

The castle was sold by Hans Bombast von Hohenheim in 1406, but the family continued to use the von Hohenheim name in the 15th and 16th centuries.

One Georg Bombast von Hohenheim (1453–1499) is mentioned in 1462 as commander of the Order of Saint John in Rohrdorf. He accompanied Count Eberhard V on his pilgrimage to Jerusalem. This Georg Bombast von Hohenheim has been suggested as the possible biological father of Wilhelm Bombast von Hohenheim (d. 1534), the father of Paracelsus (Theophrastus von Hohenheim) (1493–1541). The name Paracelsus itself is most likely a latinization of "Hohenheim" (and not, as has frequently been alleged, a reference to Aulus Cornelius Celsus).

Georg Bombast von Hohenheim (d. 1566), a nephew of Georg (d. 1499), also had a career in the Order of Saint John, and became grand prior of Germany. With his death in 1566, the male line of the family was extinct. Georg was survived by his sister, Anna Bombastin von Hohenheim (d. 1574), the third wife of Ernest, Margrave of Baden-Durlach.

The name and coat of arms was restored by Charles Eugene, Duke of Württemberg for his mistress Franziska von Bernerdin in 1774 along with the title of imperial countess.

The family name long antedates the modern use of the term "bombastic" with its negative connotations, which has a different etymological origin.
