= Lützow =

Lützow can refer to:

- Lützow, Germany, a municipality in the district of Nordwestmecklenburg in Mecklenburg-Western Pomerania in Germany
- Lützow, original name of Charlottenburg
- Daniel Freiherr von Lützow (born 1974), German politician (AfD)
- Ludwig Adolf Wilhelm von Lützow (1782–1834), a Prussian lieutenant general
  - Lützow Free Corps, a Prussian volunteer force during the Napoleonic wars commanded by Ludwig von Lützow
  - German cruiser Lützow, several ships named after Ludwig von Lützow
  - 37th SS Volunteer Cavalry Division Lützow, a cavalry division of the Waffen-SS named for Ludwig von Lützow
- Ludwig von Lützow (politician) (1793–1872), a Mecklenburg politician
- Francis Lützow (1849–1916), Czech historian
- Heinrich von Lützow (1852–1935), Austro-Hungarian diplomat
- Günther Lützow (1912–1945), German World War II fighter pilot and flying ace
  - Kampfgeschwader Lützow, a German movie of 1941
