= Louis Eugene, Duke of Württemberg =

Duke of Württemberg (1731–1795)

Louis Eugen
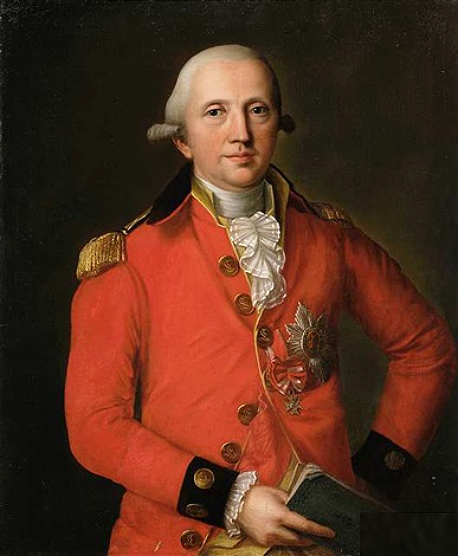
- Portrait of Louis Eugen in red uniform

Duke of Württemberg
- Reign: 24 October 1793 – 20 May 1795
- Predecessor: Karl Eugen
- Successor: Frederick II Eugen
- Born: 6 January 1731; Frankfurt am Main
- Died: 20 May 1795 (aged 64); Ludwigsburg
- Burial: Ludwigsburg Palace
- Spouse: Countess Sophie Albertine of Beichlingen
- Issue: Sophie Antoinette; Wilhelmine; Henriette
- House: House of Württemberg
- Father: Karl Alexander, Duke of Württemberg
- Mother: Maria Augusta of Thurn and Taxis

Ludwig Eugen, Duke of Württemberg (6 January 1731 – 20 May 1795), was the reigning Duke of Württemberg from 1793 until his death in 1795.

== Early life and ancestry ==
Ludwig was born as the third son of Duke Karl Alexander, Governor of the Kingdom of Serbia and Princess Maria Augusta of Thurn and Taxis.

== Reign ==
Ludwig succeeded his brother Karl Eugen as Duke of Württemberg in 1793, and reigned until his own death in 1795, when he was succeeded by his younger brother Frederick Eugen.

== Personal life ==
Ludwig married, initially morganatically, to Countess Sophie Albertine von Beichlingen (1728–1807), daughter of August Gottfried Dietrich, Count of Beichlingen and Sophie Helene, Baroness of Stöcken. They had:

- Duchess Sophie Antoinette (1763–1775), who died young.
- Duchess Wilhelmine Friederike Elisabeth (1764–1817), who married Prince Kraft Ernst von Oettingen-Oettingen und Oettingen-Wallerstein.
- Duchess Henriette Charlotte Friederike (1767–1817), who married Prince Karl Joseph von Hohenlohe-Bartenstein-Jagstberg.

== Death ==
Duke Louis Eugune died at Ludwigsburg on 20 May 1795, aged 64. His widow Sophie Albertine died twelve years later, on 10 May 1807. Both Louis Eugene and his wife were buried in the Chapel of the Ludwigsburg Palace.

== Sources ==
- Marquardt, Ernst (1962). Geschichte Württembergs (in German). J.B. Metzler.

Louis Eugene, Duke of Württemberg House of Württemberg Born: 6 January 1731 Died: 20 May 1795
Regnal titles
Preceded by Karl Eugen	Duke of Württemberg; 1793–1795	Succeeded by Friedrich II Eugen
