= Stocken =

Stocken, or Stöcken, may refer to:

- HM Prison Stocken, a prison in the county of Rutland, England
- Stöcken, Schwyz, a village in the municipality of Unteriberg, Schwyz, Switzerland
- Stocken, Sweden, a community on the island of Orust, Sweden
- Stocken, Thurgau, a locality in the municipality of Hauptwil-Gottshaus, Thurgau, Switzerland
