= Hohenheim Gardens =

Botanical gardens of the University of Hohenheim

Coordinates: 48.7082°N 9.2146°E

With an area of more than 30 hectares, the Hohenheim Gardens are the largest part of the campus of the University of Hohenheim in Stuttgart, Baden-Württemberg, Germany. The oldest part of the garden, the Exotic Garden or Franziskas Dörfle, was established in 1776 by Duke Carl Eugen von Württemberg and Franziska von Hohenheim. Today, the Hohenheim Gardens are home to around 3000 taxa of woody plants as well as numerous monuments and works of art from four centuries. Over 150 woody plants are more than 100 years old. The Hohenheim Gardens are open all year round, all day and free of charge.

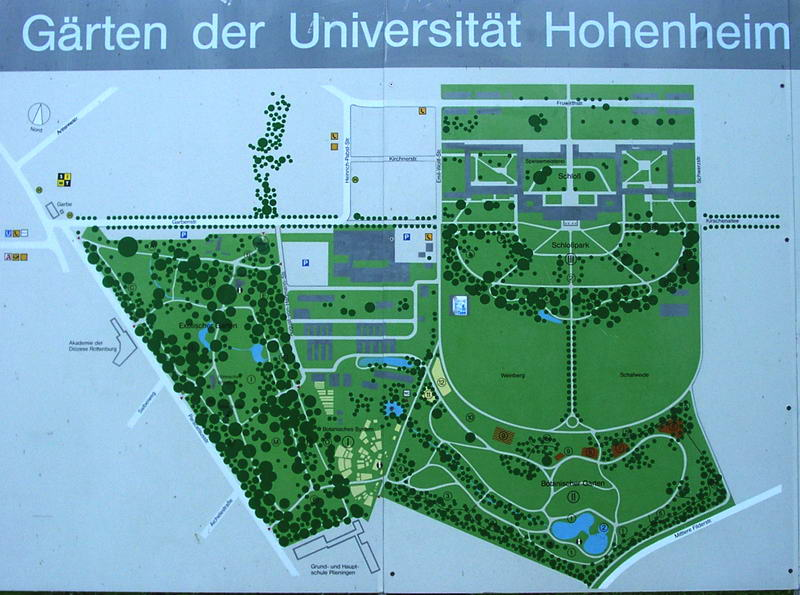
University of Hohenheim gardens, with the Botanischer Garten der Universität Hohenheim at bottom. The newer Hohenheimer Landschaftsgarten is not shown.

== Location and climate ==
The Hohenheim Gardens are located in the south of Stuttgart in the district of Plieningen on the edge of the Filder plain in the central Neckar region between 340 and 380 metres above sea level. The soil consists of loess loam. The annual mean temperature is 8.8 °C and the annual precipitation total is 690 mm. Together with neighbouring areas, they form the landscape conservation area "Körschtal", which is characterised by the valley of the river Körsch.

== Garden sections ==
Sections of the Hohenheim Gardens
Garden section	Year of establishment	Area
State Arboretum - Exotic Garden	1776	9.3 ha (23 acres)
State Arboretum - Landscape Garden	1998	7.2 ha (18 acres)
Hohenheim Palace Park	1785	4.2 ha (10 acres)
Botanic Garden - Plant System	1901	0.8 ha (2.0 acres)
Botanic Garden - History of Vegetation and Medicinal Plant Gardens	1974	8.5 ha (21 acres)
Collection greenhouse	2014	600 m^{2} (6,500 sq ft)
Total		30 ha (74 acres)

Today, the Hohenheim Gardens cover around 30 hectares of parkland. Large parts of the ensemble are used by the University of Hohenheim for teaching and research purposes. South of Hohenheim Palace lies the Hohenheim Schlossberg with a vineyard and a former sheep pasture.

== State Arboretum - Exotic Garden ==
The oldest part of the Hohenheim Gardens is the Exotic Garden, which lies to the southwest of the palace. Between 1776 and 1793 it was designed as an English garden under Duke Carl Eugen von Württemberg and his favourite and later wife Franziska von Hohenheim. Duke Carl Eugen, through his court architect Reinhard F. Heinrich Fischer, contributed around 60 scenes with monuments and buildings to this garden concept, ruins of antiquity next to Baroque representative buildings and buildings from village surroundings. The gardens were also known as Franziskas Dörfle. Friedrich Schiller described the Park at Hohenheim as follows: "But the nature we find in this English garden is no longer the one we started from. It is nature animated with spirit and exalted by art, [...]" After the duke's death in 1793, some buildings, e.g. the ruined aqueduct or the guardhouse, were moved to Ludwigsburg Palace Park, others fell into disrepair. The "Spielhaus", the "Wirtshaus zur Stadt Rom", the ruins of the "Three Pillars of Thundering Jupiter" and the "Schäferberg" have been preserved. Today, the “Spielhaus” houses the Museum of the History of Hohenheim, where a scale model of the garden at that time with all its architecture is on display and murals by Viktor Heideloff can be seen.

== State Arboretum - Landscape Garden ==
Located to the south of the Exotic Garden, Hohenheim's most recent garden section, the Landscape Garden was established in 1998. Here, on a hill, there is an open monopteros, surrounded by eight columnar hornbeams, which serves as a vantage point. Ornamental fruit trees such as apples, pears, cherries and hawthorns have been planted as leading shrubs. A large wildflower meadow in the central area connects the woody plantings.

== Hohenheim Palace Park ==
Directly in front of the residential palace, built in 1785, lies the semicircular Hohenheim Palace Park with its old stock of trees and shrubs. Following the example of Versailles, Duke Carl Eugen had a late Baroque representative garden laid out, whose path system still exists today. In 1829, a botanical garden with open spaces and groups of trees was created in the Palace Park for agricultural and forestry training. Later, viewpoints and monuments were added. From about 1901, a kind of plant system was located here, with plants sorted according to functional groups. In 1974, the beds of the Old Botanical Garden were relocated south of the Schlossberg, but the woody planting remained. On the south side of Hohenheim Palace, the heritage-listed Jägerallee is situated between the vineyard and the sheep pasture. From 1772 onwards this avenue was planted with Italian columnar poplars, grown by the ducal court gardener Johann Caspar Schiller, Friedrich Schiller's father. These were replaced in the mid-19th century by the Canadian poplars which line the path today.

== Vegetation history and medicinal plant gardens ==
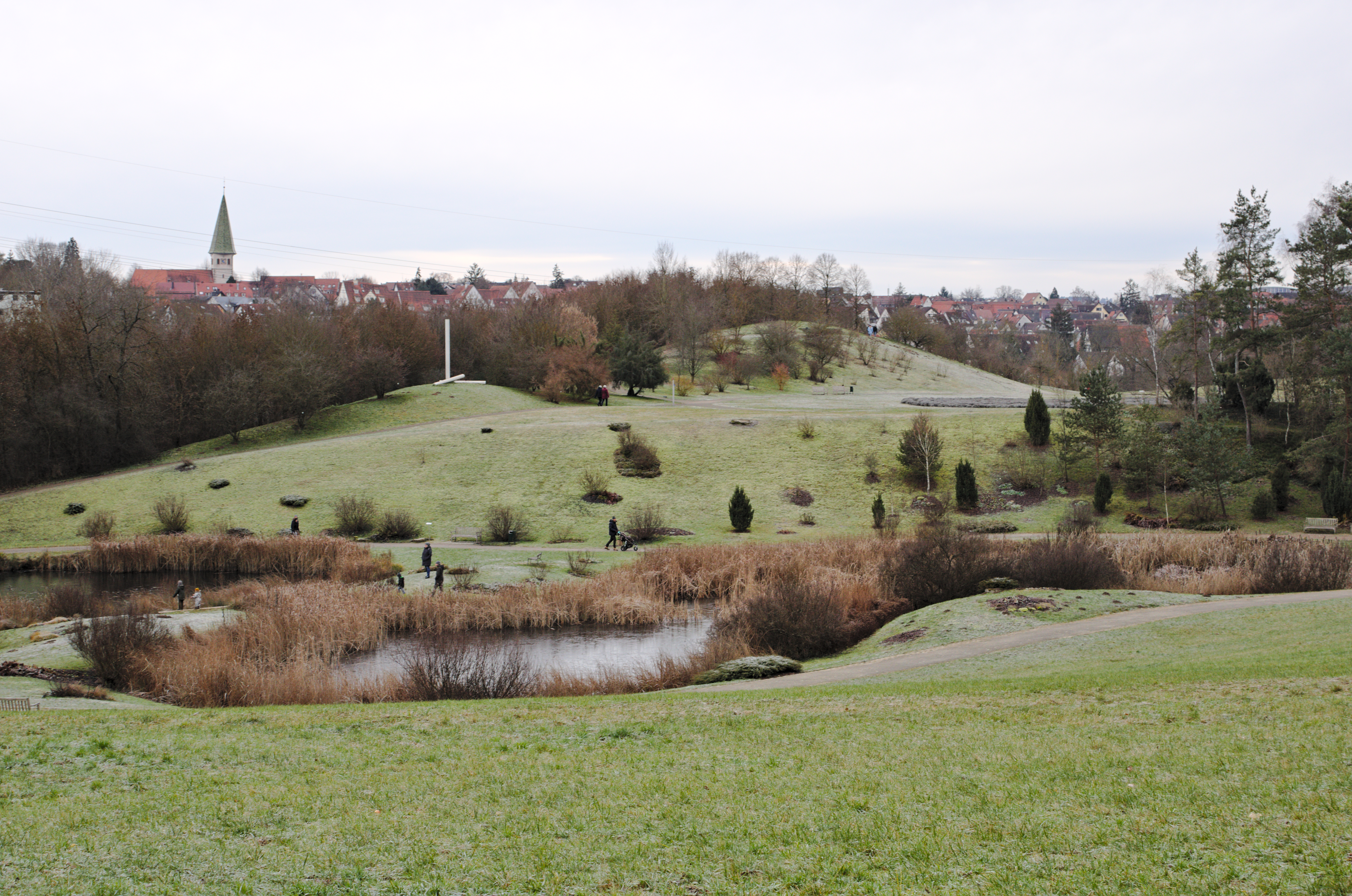
Vegetation history

South of Hohenheim Palace below the poplar-lined avenue on the Schlossberg lies the Botanical Garden. Here the development of the vegetation of Central Europe from the last ice age about 15,000 to 11,000 years ago until today is displayed and presented on a circular walk. The two ponds in the valley are surrounded by steppe-tundra vegetation. Starting from there, the re-immigration of woody plants to the warmer hilly landscapes and the low mountain ranges of southern Germany is shown on the slopes of the Schlossberg. The history of useful plants from the Neolithic, Bronze Age, Iron Age and the Middle Ages is also re-created on four plots. The site was designed in 1974 by the professors of Botany Burkhard Frenzel and Udelgard Körber-Grohne. In the western part of the vegetation history section, two medicinal plant gardens have been laid out. One shows the medicinal plants of the abbess Hildegard von Bingen arranged in beds according to their areas of application, the other shows the medicinal plants used today and in the past grouped according to their effective ingredients.

== Plant System ==
A plant system, sorted according to functional botanical groups, was used by Hohenheim botany professor Oskar von Kirchner around 1901 in the Hohenheim Palace Park. In 1974 it was moved to its present location south of the Hohenheim Collection Greenhouse. The plant system contains around 3000 species from 230 families. It was planted according to developmental aspects based on the systematics of the US botanist Arthur John Cronquist. It is also home to a large subtropical potted plant collection.

== Collection Greenhouse ==
In 1789, the first heated greenhouse in Hohenheim, the so-called Iron House, was built as part of the English Garden, where Duke Carl Eugen kept a pineapple collection with over 1000 different plants. In 1896, newer greenhouses were built under Oskar von Kirchner, and the cold and warm house collection has continued ever since. In 2014, the current Collection Greenhouse was opened. One of the largest begonia collections in Germany is kept here. In addition, there are sections with tropical plants of East Africa, an area with orchids and aquatic plants, an area with insectivorous plants, a cactus house, a section for tropical useful plants and one for African desert plants.

== Special woody plants ==
Duke Carl Eugen and especially Franziska von Hohenheim began collecting woody plants when the garden was established in 1776. In 1785, the garden theorist Cay Lorenz von Hirschfeld described the Exotic Garden as "the richest and most complete collection of foreign trees and shrubs that we possess in Germany", based on the woody plant directory of 1780. From 1813 onwards, the main focus was on an arboretum with botanical-scientific orientation, and the nursery became the Royal Exotic State Nursery. In the process, the concepts from the time of Franziska von Hohenheim were revived and the main emphasis was once again on collecting.

This tradition continued and in 1953 the garden was elevated to the status of "Landesarboretum Baden-Württemberg". This was later extended by the landscape garden. Today it contains around 2500 different woody plants. Major focal points of the collection are Acer, Betula, Magnolia, Quercus and leguminous species. In addition, there is a large assortment of old woody plant varieties and forms. All woody plants can be found in the woody plant database and are georeferenced.

The Exotic Garden in Hohenheim still contains several trees from the ducal period, planted between 1779 and 1793, including several American tulip trees, a maple-leaved plane tree and two summer lime trees. Other woody plants date from the time of the Royal Württemberg exotic tree nursery between 1799 and 1840. There are over 180 entries for the Hohenheim gardens in the list of Champion Trees from the German Dendrological Society, 60 of which are record-breaking trees in Germany, and 120 record-breaking trees in Baden-Württemberg.

== Monuments and works of art ==
Listed in each case are the name of the artist, the year of dedication and the name of the work of art/monument.

- English Garden 1777: The Roman Inn
- English Garden 1778: The Three Pillars of Thundering Jupiter
- English Garden 1788: The ‘Spielhaus’
- Kurt Fanghänel 1901: Bismarck Monument
- Günter Ott 1979: Memorial of the Ackerbau students
- Markus Wolf (sculptor) 1998: Franziska Monument
- Edgar Haldenwang 1998: Vision
- Hans Dieter Schaal 2001: Monopteros
- Renate Hoffleit 2004: Mittagsstele
- Markus Wolf (sculptor) 2008: Katharina Monument
- Uli Gsell 2013: Paracelsus Memorial Stone

A monument for Franziska von Hohenheim, the second wife of Duke Carl Eugen, was erected in 1998 on her 250th birthday. This monument, designed by the Plieningen sculptor Markus Wolf in the form of an obelisk, stands at the crossroads between Das Wirtshaus zur Stadt Rom [the Roman Inn] and the ‘Spielhaus’ in the Exotic Garden. To mark the 220th birthday of Catherine Pavlovna of Russia, Queen of Württemberg, a monument, also designed by Markus Wolf, was erected above the vineyard on 28 May 2008.

== Literature ==
- Gottlob Heinrich Rapp: Description of the garden in Hohenheim. In: Pocket Calendar for the Year ... for nature and garden lovers. With illustrations of Hohenheim and other engravings. Tübingen 1795-1799, reprint 1991-1998 - 1795: pp. 53–79, 1796: pp. 49–77, 1797: pp. 57–87, 1798: pp. 97–124, 1799: pp. 57–85 - Illustrations online: 1795, 1796, 1797, 1798, 1799.
- Adolf Martin Steiner, Ulrich Fellmeth, Matthias Frisch: Hohenheim Gardens. History and Art. Hohenheim 2008.
- Robert Gliniars, Adolf Martin Steiner: The Hohenheim Gardens - A Paradise in the South of Stuttgart. 96 pages, 70 colour photos, Verlag Eugen Ulmer, 2018.
- Robert Gliniars, Adolf Martin Steiner: The Hohenheim Gardens. In: University of Hohenheim 1818-2018. ed. H. Hagemann and G. Kollmer-von Oheim-Loup; Festschrift zum 200jährigen Jubiläum. pp. 354–383, 16 illustrations. Eugen Ulmer Publishers, 2018.
- Robert Gliniars: Hohenheim Gardens - Palace Park, State Arboretum and Botanical Garden. Gartenpraxis (Ulmer-Verlag), 01, 76-78, 2016.
- Günter Koch, Rainer Bäßler: Landesarboretum Baden-Württemberg - Gehölzkatalog. 208 pages, University of Hohenheim, 2008.
- Adolf Martin Steiner, Ulrich Fellmeth: Denkmale und Gedenksteine in den Hohenheimer Gärten und Grünanlagen. Der Goldene Pflug (DLM Hohenheim) 31, 41-46, 2010.
- Adolf Martin Steiner, Ulrich Fellmeth, Matthias Frisch: Hohenheim Gardens - History and Art. (Archive of the University of Hohenheim), 2008.
- Adolf Martin Steiner, Ulrich Fellmeth, Robert Gliniars: Hohenheim - Der Schlosspark - Geschichte, Denkmäler, Gehölze. (Archive of the University of Hohenheim), 2014.

== See also ==
- Landesarboretum Baden-Württemberg
- List of botanical gardens in Germany
