= Körsch =

River in Germany

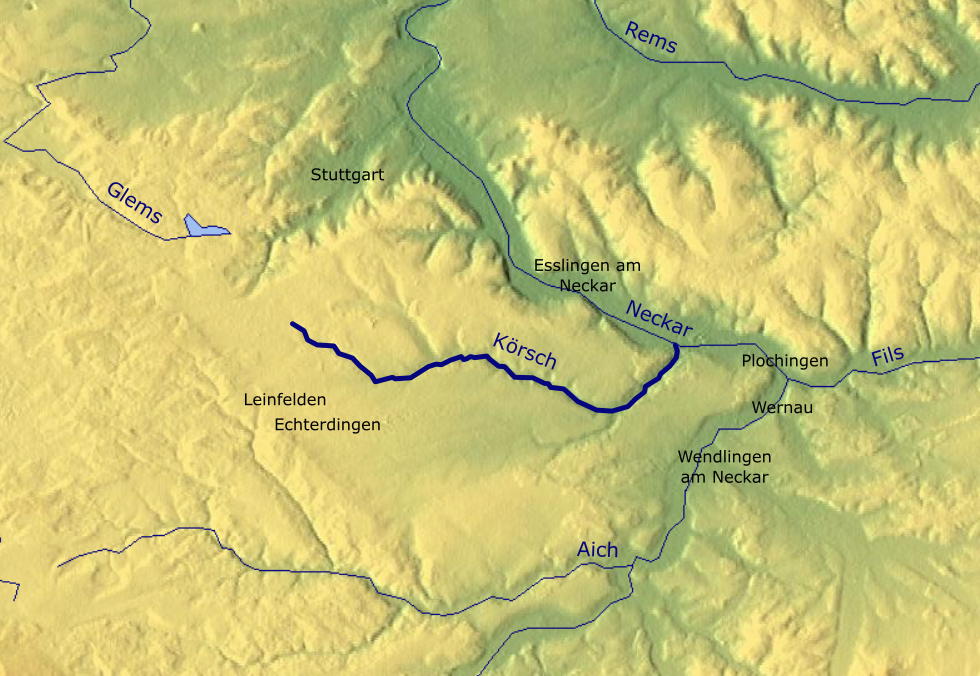
- Course of the Körsch

Location
- Country: Germany
- State: Baden-Württemberg

Physical characteristics
- Mouth
  - location: Neckar
  - coordinates: 48.7164°N 9.3588°E
- Length: 27.5 km (17.1 mi)
- Basin size: 128 km^{2} (49 sq mi)

Basin features
- Progression: Neckar→ Rhine→ North Sea
- Tributaries
  - left: Aischbach, Höfelbach
  - right: Sindelbach

The Körsch (German: [kœʁʃ]; in its upper course: Sindelbach) is a river of Baden-Württemberg, Germany. It is a left tributary of the Neckar at Deizisau.

It is the second largest waterbody in Stuttgart and is formed at the convergence of the right Sindelbach and the left Aischbach in Stuttgart-Möhringen. After almost 27 km on the Filder it flows into the Neckar between Esslingen am Neckar and Deizisau.

== See also ==
- List of rivers of Baden-Württemberg
