= Charles Eugene, Duke of Württemberg =

Duke of Württemberg (1728–1793)

Charles Eugene
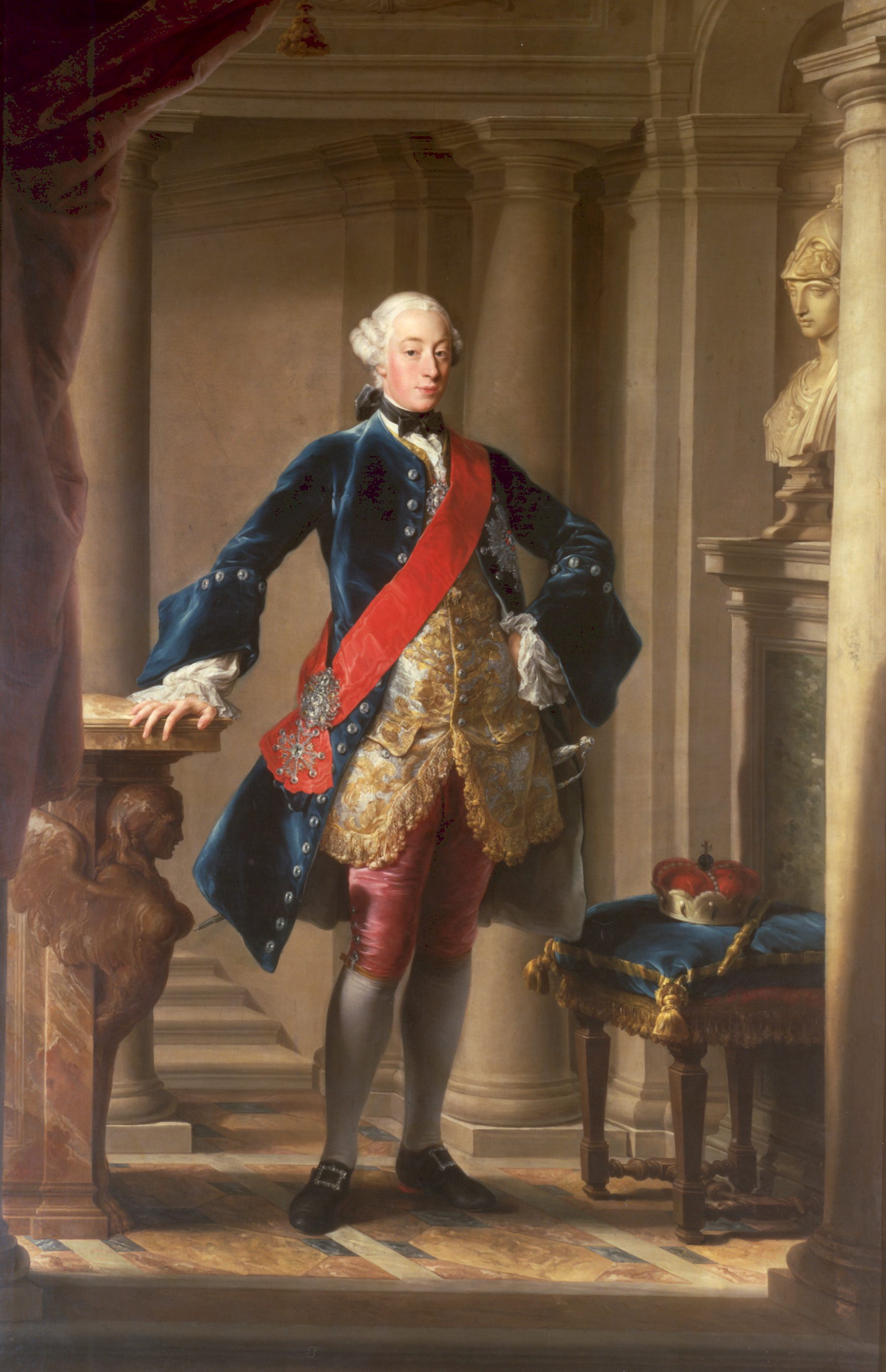
- Portrait by Pompeo Batoni, c. 1753–56

Duke of Württemberg
- Reign: 12 March 1737 – 24 October 1793
- Predecessor: Charles Alexander
- Successor: Louis Eugene
- Born: 11 February 1728; Brussels, Austrian Netherlands, Holy Roman Empire
- Died: 24 October 1793 (aged 65); Hohenheim, Württemberg, Holy Roman Empire
- Burial: Ludwigsburg Palace
- Spouse: Princess Elisabeth Friederike Sophie of Brandenburg-Bayreuth (m. 1748; died 1780) Countess Franziska von Hohenheim (m. 1780)
- Issue: Frederic von Franquemont (illegitimate)
- Father: Charles Alexander, Duke of Württemberg
- Mother: Princess Marie Auguste of Thurn and Taxis

Charles Eugene (German: Carl Eugen; 11 February 1728 – 24 October 1793) was the Duke of Württemberg, and the eldest son, and successor, of Charles Alexander; his mother was Princess Marie Auguste of Thurn and Taxis.

== Life ==
Born in Brussels, he succeeded his father as ruler of Württemberg at the age of 9, but the real power was in the hands of Regents Carl Rudolf, Duke of Württemberg-Neuenstadt and Carl Frederick von Württemberg-Oels.

He was educated at the court of Frederick II of Prussia. He also studied keyboard with Carl Philipp Emanuel Bach in the 1740s (Bach's "Württemberg" sonatas, published in 1744, were dedicated to Charles Eugene).

In his early years he ruled with an iron fist. In 1744 he ordered that the corpse of Joseph Süß Oppenheimer, his father's financial advisor executed by the Duke of Württemberg-Neuenstadt, whose decaying corpse had been suspended in an iron cage by Stuttgart's Prag gallows for six years, be taken down and given a decent burial. He was also well known for his extensive library, his extravagant interest in opera, and interest in large scale horticulture for the feeding of the masses.

Charles Eugene made the first of his five trips to Paris and the Palace of Versailles in 1748 with his first wife. He used these trips to sightsee and acquire Parisian goods for Ludwigsburg Palace while touring the workshops those goods were manufactured in. From 1776 Etienne Sollicoffre, a banker Charles Eugene had met in Paris, befriended the Duke and acted as the agent of his purchases in the city.

Between 1751 and 1759 Karl Eugen was involved in an increasingly bitter struggle with his adviser, the eminent Liberal jurist Johann Jakob Moser who strongly opposed the Duke's absolutist tendencies. In 1759 Charles Eugene had Moser charged with authoring "a subversive writing" and cast into prison for the next five years. However, in 1764 Moser was released, due in part to the intercession of Friedrich the Great of Prussia, and was rehabilitated and restored to his position, rank and titles.

Having accepted a subsidy from the French, in the Seven Years' War against Prussia, Charles Eugene advanced into Saxony.

In 1761, Charles Eugene founded an Académie des Arts in Stuttgart (now the State Academy of Fine Arts Stuttgart), in 1765 a public library in Ludwigsburg (now the Württembergische Landesbibliothek, Stuttgart), and he was responsible for the construction of a number of other key palaces and buildings in the area including the New Palace which still stands at the centre of the Schlossplatz, Solitude Palace, Einsiedel Palace and Castle Hohenheim.

Charles Eugene was known for his interest in agriculture and travel and is considered the inspiration behind today's Hohenheim university, part of which now occupies his former summer estate. His original botanical gardens form the basis for today's Landesarboretum Baden-Württemberg and Botanischer Garten der Universität Hohenheim, which still contain some of the specimens he planted. He was also involved in Aviculture. He built a large number of palaces and bankrupted his lands through courtly extravagance, accepting huge French government loans in exchange for maintaining large numbers of support troops in Württemberg.

He was an early patron of Friedrich Schiller. However, in 1780 he had him arrested for deserting his post as a regimental doctor in Stuttgart in order to attend the first performance of his play The Robbers in Mannheim. Schiller was sentenced to 14 days of imprisonment, and forbidden by Karl Eugen from publishing any further works.

Hermann Sacher, writing in the Catholic Encyclopedia called Charles Eugene "a despot, spendthrift, and profligate". Charles Eugene ruled until his death in 1793, when he was succeeded by his younger brother. He died in Hohenheim.

=== Marriages ===
Charles Eugene married twice, first in Bayreuth on 26 September 1748 to Margravine Elisabeth Fredericka Sophie of Brandenburg-Bayreuth with whom he had one daughter, Friederike Wilhelmine Augusta Luise Charlotte, who was born in Stuttgart on 19 February 1750 and died after 13 months in Stuttgart on 12 March 1751. Elisabetha left Charles Eugene in 1756 to return to her parents' court in Bayreuth although they never divorced.

In the meantime, Charles Eugene kept a string of mistresses and fathered eleven children by them. The last of these mistresses was Franziska von Hohenheim, whom he raised to the status of Countess and married in Stuttgart on 10 or 11 January 1785.

=== Mistresses and illegitimate issue ===
By an unknown mistress he had:

- Karoline (31 December 1755 – 14 May 1839), unmarried and without issue

By Luisa Toscani he had:

- Karl von Ostheim (1761 – Batavia, 24 February 1793), unmarried and without issue
- Karl Alexander von Ostheim (31 December 1765 – after 1821), unmarried and without issue

By an unknown mistress he had:

- Charlotte (9 February 1762 – 31 August 1811), married 30 June 1783 Julius Friedrich von Lützow (? – 4 July 1833), without issue

By Teresa Bonafoni he had:

- Karl Bonafoni (2 July 1768 – 30 April 1769)
- Karl genannt Borel (18 May 1770 – before 1821), who committed suicide, unmarried and without issue

By Anna Eleonora Franchi he had:

- Eugen Franchi (5 October 1768 – c. 1794), unmarried and without issue
- Eleonore Franchi, Freiin von Franquemont (17 January 1771 – 1833), married in 1792 Jean François Louis Marie, Comte d'Orsay (15 June 1772 – 26 December 1843), and had issue

By an unknown mistress he had:

- Friedrich Wilhelm (? – 19 December 1790), unmarried and without issue

By Katharina Kurz he had:

- Karl-David von Franquemont (13 March 1769 – 20 July 1830), married firstly in May 1795 to a Baroness Maria Barbara von Hügel (1778-1803), daughter of Baron Theobald von Hügel (1739-1800), by whom he had a daughter, and married secondly in May 1795 to Luise Sophie Henriette von Jett (September 1783 – 24 January 1852), by whom he had a daughter:
  - Charlotte Elisabeth Piron von Franquemont (1797–1868), who lived in Ceylon and married Matthias Johann August David von Franquemont (1795-1844)
  - Karoline Luise von Franquemont (Semarang, 20 July 1800 – Ludwigsburg, 3 April 1857), married on 21 October 1819 Johann von Raben (? – 18 November 1853), without issue

By Regina Monti he had:

- Friedrich, Graf von Franquemont (Ludwigsburg, 5 March 1770 – 3 January 1842), unmarried and without issue, general and War minister.

Charles Eugene, Duke of Württemberg House of Württemberg Born: 11 February 1728 Died: 24 October 1793
Regnal titles
Preceded by Charles Alexander	Duke of Württemberg; 1737–1793	Succeeded by Louis Eugene
