= Countess Franziska von Hohenheim =

German noblewoman (1748–1811)

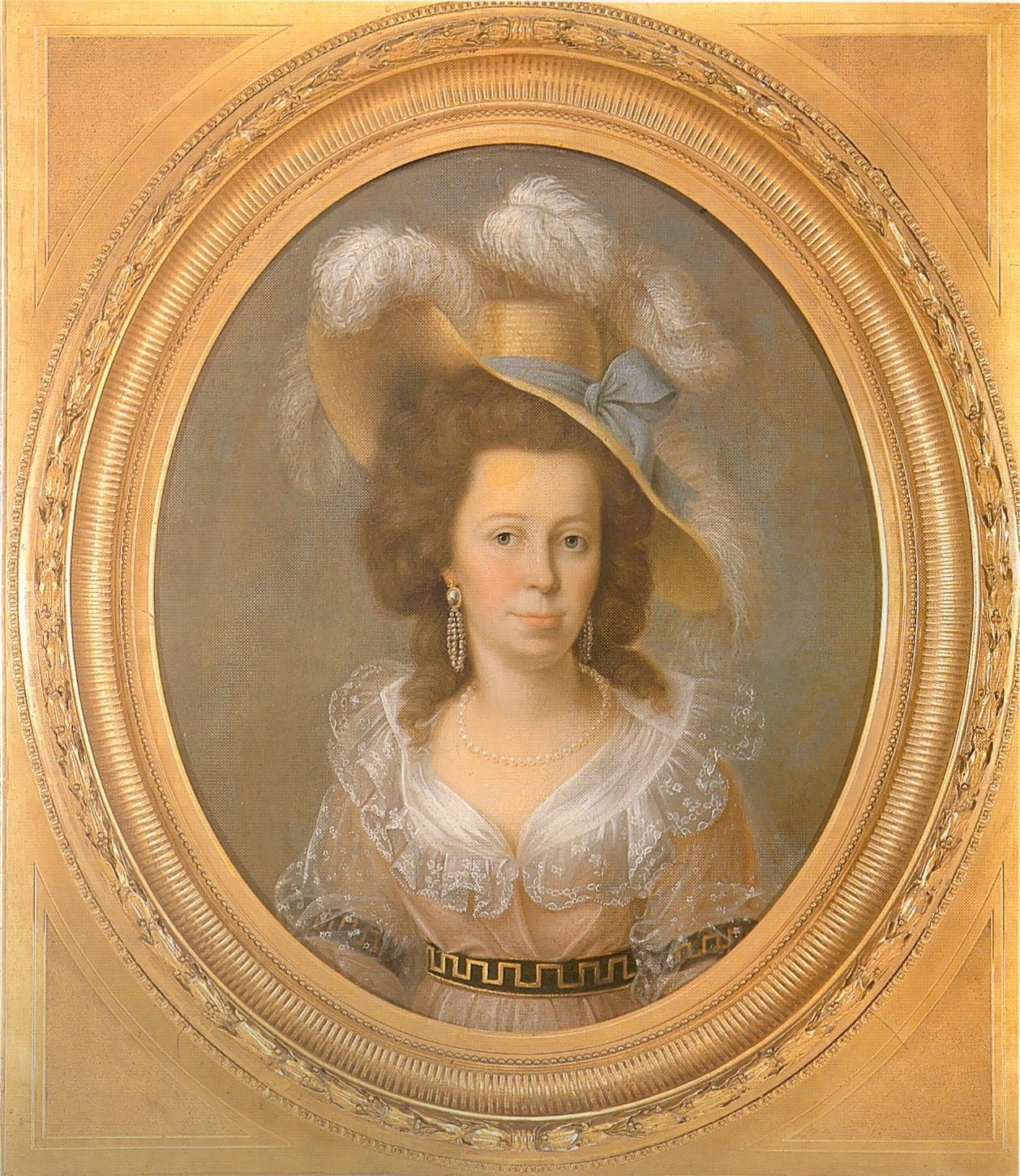
Portrait by Jakob Friedrich Weckherlin, in 1790

Countess Franziska Theresia von Hohenheim (10 January 1748 in Adelmannsfelden – 1 January 1811 in Kirchheim unter Teck) was a German noblewoman. From birth she was a Baroness von Bernerdin and from 1765 onwards Baroness Leutrum von Ertingen. She was the official mistress of Charles Eugene, Duke of Württemberg from 1772 to 1785, when she became his second wife. The marriage was morganatic until 1790, when she was allowed use of the dynastic title Duchess of Württemberg.

== Life ==
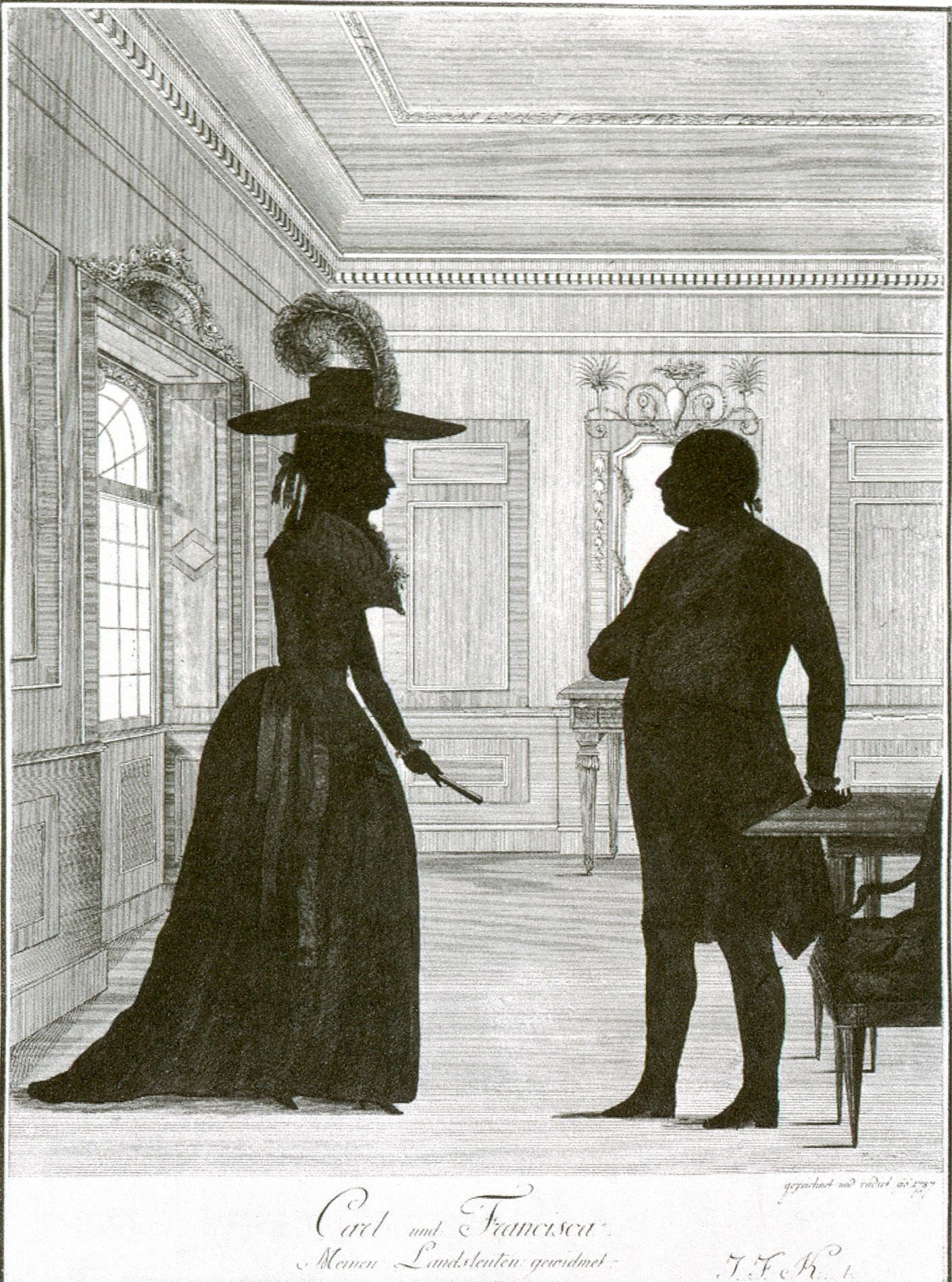
Franziska and Charles Eugene, engraving by Johann Friedrich Knisel, 1787

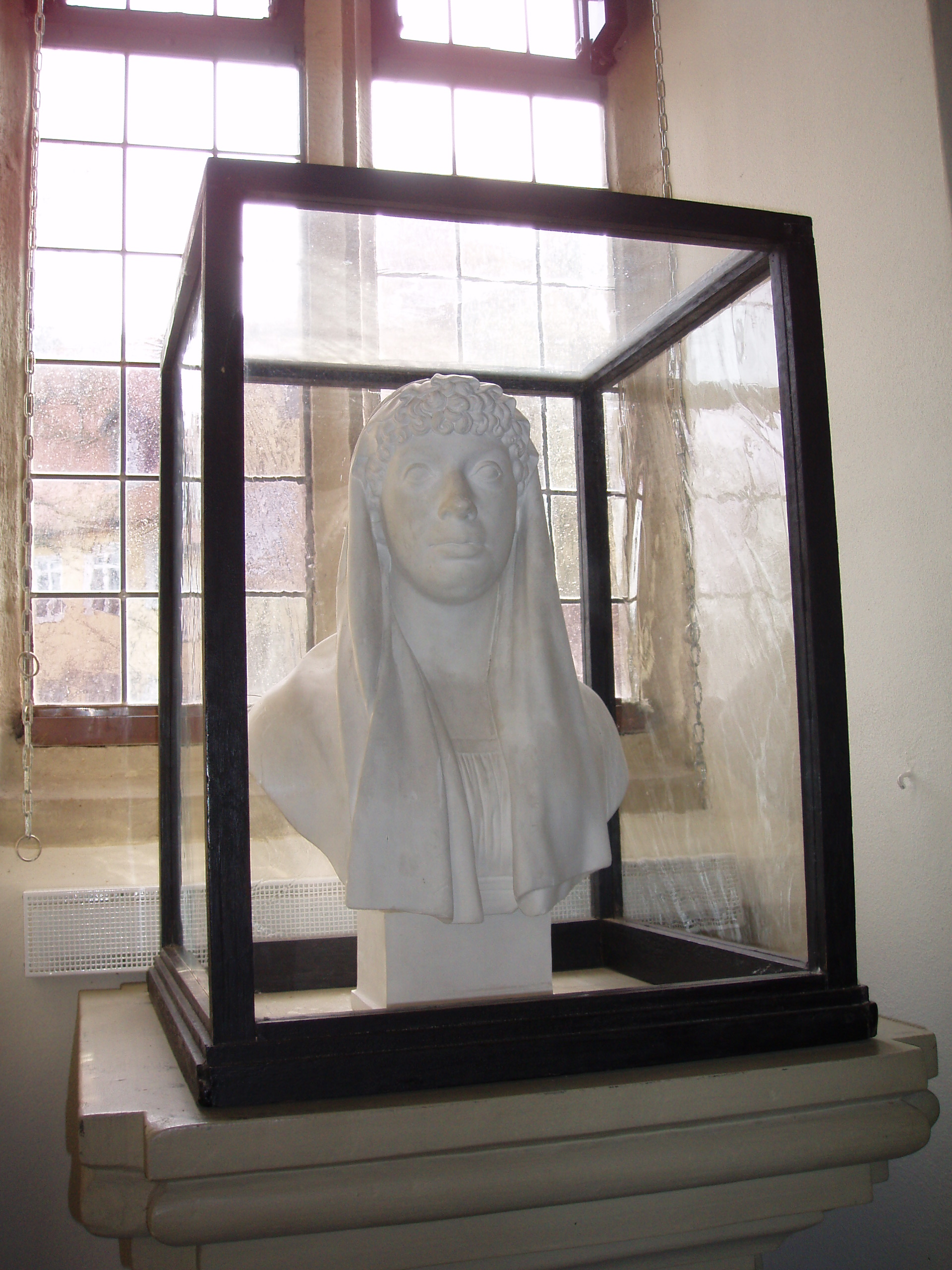
Bust by Daniel Mack, 1804

She was the daughter of Freiherr Ludwig Wilhelm von Bernerdin zum Pernthurn (1717–1774) and his wife, Baroness Johanna Dorothea Charlotte von Vohenstein zu Adelmansfelden (1718–1793) – of this couple's 15 children, only Franziska and four of her sisters reached adulthood. She spent her childhood in their family seat, Castle Sindlingen in the district of Böblingen. At her parents' request, in 1765 Franziska married Baron Friedrich Wilhelm Leutrum von Ertringen (b. 1742). Once her husband had been appointed a chamberlain at the Württemberg court, they had to appear at court more often. In 1769, during a stay in Bad Wildbad, Franziska got to know Duke Charles Eugene better. After he separated from his long-term mistress, Catharina Bonafin, the baroness became his maitresse en titre in 1772. On 21 January 1774, at Charles' instigation, Franziska was made Imperial Countess von Hohenheim – she was subsequently promoted to Princess by Holy Roman Emperor Joseph II – and from then on bore the coat of arms of the extinct Bombaste von Hohenheim family. The Duke gave her the Garbenhof at Hohenheim on 10 January 1772 and she expanded it in the following decades into the Schloss Hohenheim, taking a particular interest in the creation of its Dörfle or English-style landscape garden from 1776 onwards.

Franziska's worldview was shaped by Protestant Pietistic ideas and so the nature of her relationship with the Duke to be immoral and felt guilty about it. She divorced her husband in 1772 but the Catholic Charles Eugene could not annul his wife Elisabeth of Bayreuth. In autumn 1756 Elisabeth had gone to visit her mother in Bayreuth and refused to return. Charles agreed she would remain his duchess, which she did until her death in April 1780. After Elisabeth's death Charles and Franziska exchanged marriage vows on 10 July 1780. The Catholic Church did not, however, recognise Franziska's divorce and would not allow Charles to marry a Protestant. Also Franziska was not Charles' equal under Württemberg house law so any marriage would be morganatic.

Charles thus not only sought to make Franziska his lawful wife but also to obtain recognition for her as his duchess, both of which goals he pursued steadily for years. First, the Ehegericht (marriage court) lifted the ban on their marriage, naming Franziska as the guilty party in her divorce. In drawing up the agreement for the morganatic marriage on 15 May 1784, Charles Eugene made his younger brother Frederick Eugene (and ultimately Frederick's son Frederick William) his successor. On 10 or 11 January 1785 the ducal chaplain secretly married Franziska and Charles Eugene in Stuttgart, though the marriage was only proclaimed publicly on 2 February 1786. In 1790 Charles Eugene finally reached an agreement with Frederick Eugene and Frederick William: Franziska would be recognised as duchess and Kirchheim unter Teck as her Wittum, with any potential descendants barred from the succession, while Frederick Eugene's wife, born Princess Friederike of Brandenburg-Schwedt, would retain precedence over Franziska. The pope only recognised the marriage in 1791, after the Vatican obtained theological and expert opinions as to the invalidity of Franziska's first marriage. This eventually also led to formal recognition of Franziska by Louis Eugene, Charles Eugene's middle brother, who was himself in a morganatic marriage. In this manner Franziska became "Herrin von Württemberg".

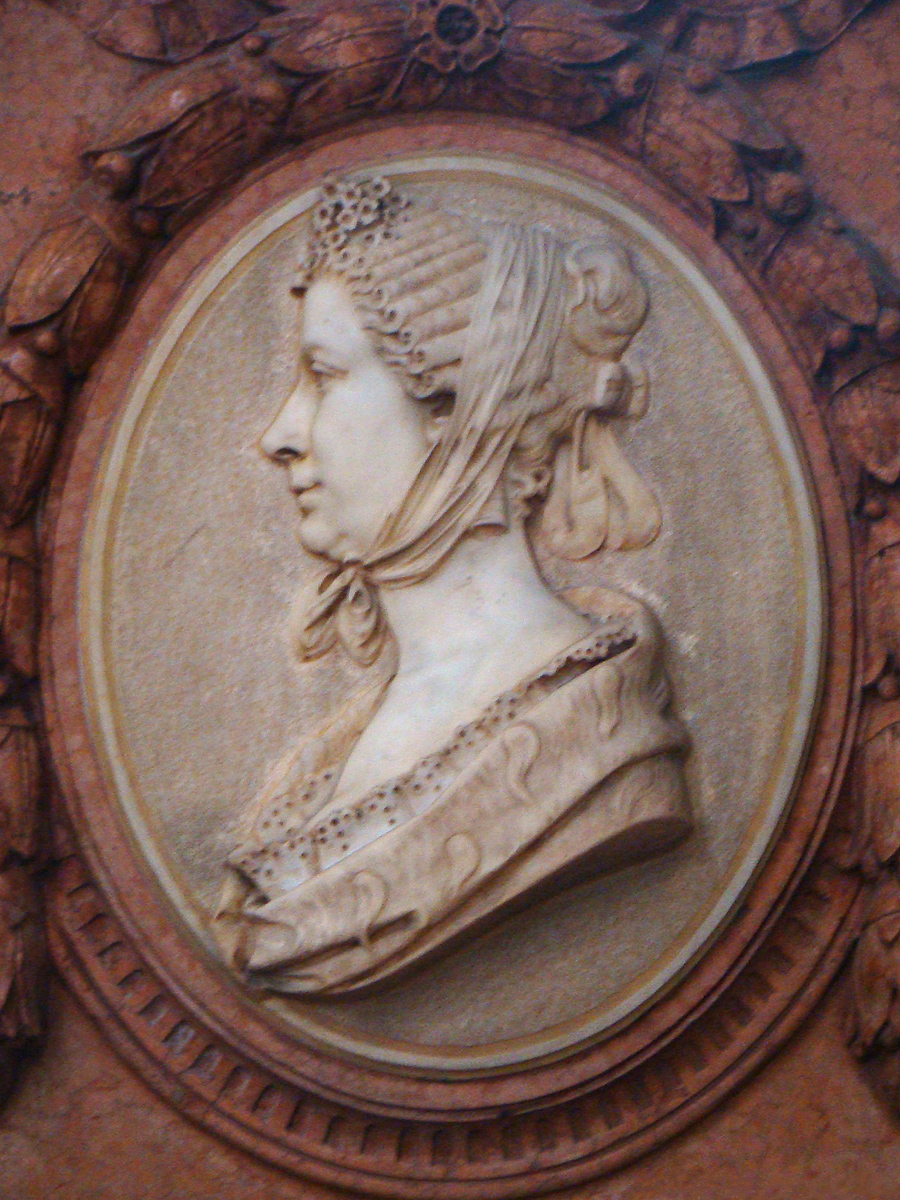
Grave memorial with portrait bust, 1906

Franziska acquired a reputation in Württemberg as a kind and caring woman due to her charity work, donations and moderating influence on the Duke (initially unpredictable and pompous, she guided him into at the role of a caring father of his country). She became known in her lifetime as the "Good Angel of Württemberg". After the Duke's death (upon which Frederick Eugene, Louis Eugene and Frederick William succeeded to the duchy, in turn), she gave safe haven to the Pietist and Theosophist Johann Michael Hahn in Sindlingen after he was persecuted for his views by the church in Württemberg. On Charles Eugene's death in 1793 Franziska had to leave Schloss Hohenheim and in January 1795 she moved into Schloss Kirchheim, spending summer months on her estates in Sindlingen and Bächingen an der Brenz, the latter which she had paid off but tried to sell after Charles' death, being financially strapped. She rarely came to the Stuttgart court, since her relations with Charles Eugene's family, especially his nephew Frederick William, were tense after Charles Eugene's death.

On New Year's Day 1811 she died in Schloss Kirchheim after long suffering from endometrial cancer. Five days later she was buried in the choir of the Martinskirche in Kirchheim, contrary to her wish to be buried beside Charles Eugene in Ludwigsburg. Her tomb was later lost, only being rediscovered in 1885. In 1906 the württembergischen Geschichts- und Altertumsverein placed a marble relief of her on the south wall of the choir and in 1962 her remains were reburied in a new oak coffin.

German royalty
Vacant Title last held by Princess Elisabeth Friederike Sophie of Brandenburg-Bayreuth	Duchess consort of Württemberg; 1790–1793	Succeeded by Princess Friederike of Brandenburg-Schwedt
