= Hohenheim Castle =

Schloss Hohenheim
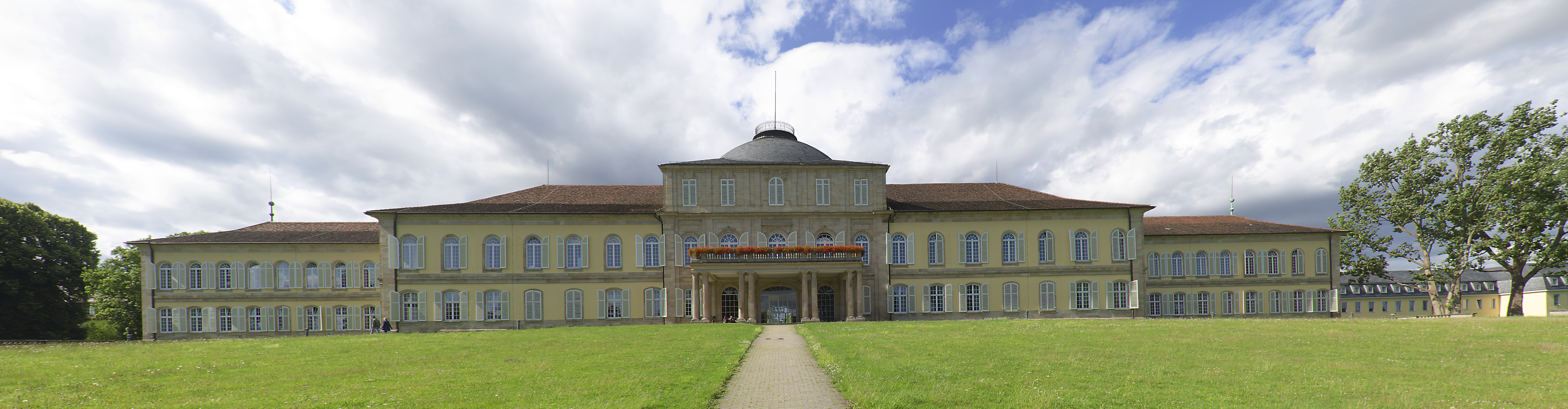

- Location within Baden-Württemberg Location within Germany

General information
- Type: Schloss (Castle)
- Architectural style: Rococo
- Classification: Schloss
- Location: Hohenheim, Schloß Hohenheim 1, 70599 Stuttgart, S-Plieningen, Stuttgart, Germany
- Coordinates: 48°42′43″N 9°12′50.6″E
- Named for: 1772
- Client: University of Hohenheim

Design and construction
- Architect: Reinhard Heinrich Ferdinand Fischer

Website
- www.stuttgart.de/en/item/show/335707/1

For the district inside the city of Stuttgart, see Hohenheim.

Schloss Hohenheim is a manor estate in Stuttgart, eponymous of the Hohenheim city district. The original castle was a fief of the County of Württemberg, recorded for the 12th century. The estate fell into the possession of Charles Eugene, Duke of Württemberg in 1768, who had it re-built as a Rococo style manor with extensive gardens and residential palace for his future wife, Franziska von Hohenheim. The estate was the main ducal residence during 1772–1797, when it fell to the city of Stuttgart. An Agricultural Educational Testing and Model Institution was housed here in 1818, and the estate remains in use by the Horticulture and Agriculture Departments of the University of Hohenheim.

== History ==
The first mention of Hohenheim is in a donation of some land to Hirsau Abbey by Egilof von Hohenheim. The castle was sold by the von Hohenheim family in 1406, and passed to the Esslingen hospital in 1432. In 1676, it was bought by Immanuel von Garb, after whom it was known as Garbenhof for some time. As von Garb's granddaughter died without heirs in 1768, the estate fell into the possession of Charles Eugene, Duke of Württemberg.

Charles Eugene made Hohenheim his main residence in 1772 and made major changes to the estate, turning it into a full sized Rococo manor. The gardens around the castle were also planned at this time. They featured pillars depicting the Roman gods Jupiter (god) and a playhouse now used as a museum by the University of Hohenheim. The gardens continued to be maintained and many exotic plants were added. The Duke commissioned an extensive residential palace to be built on the grounds of Hohenheim in 1782 until construction halted in 1793 due to the Duke's death at Hohenheim.

His brother, Duke Frederick II Eugene died in Hohenheim in 1797, after which the estate land was rented out to tenants and the manor and gardens placed under the administration of the city of Stuttgart, falling into gradual decline. It was used as a military hospital in 1814.

In 1818, King Wilhelm I of Württemberg and his wife Catherine founded the Agricultural Educational Testing and Model Institution, which was housed in a separate building on the castle and the Paracelsus School was housed in the east wing much later.

A wing of the castle was destroyed during World War II. In the 1970s, the castle was restored and modernized and the rococo plaster removed. The 1990s saw the return of this plaster to lock once again.

== Current use ==
Today, the University of Hohenheim uses large portions of the castle grounds. The Horticulture and Agriculture Departments of the University have been found on the castle grounds since 1818. The Kavaliersbau German: Squire's lodge, the University of Hohenheim established a canteen in 1918 that was converted into a restaurant in 1958.

== Gallery ==
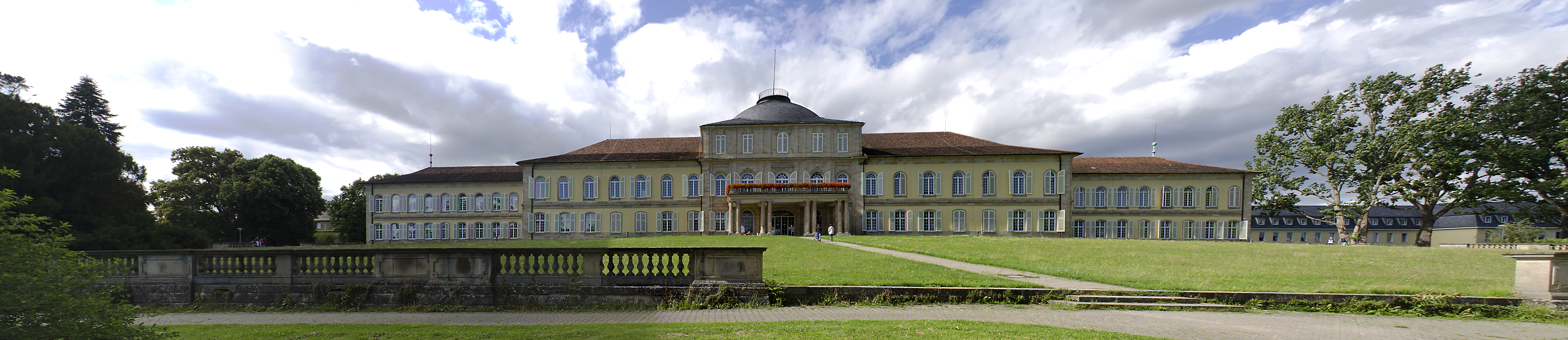
Schloss Hohenheim

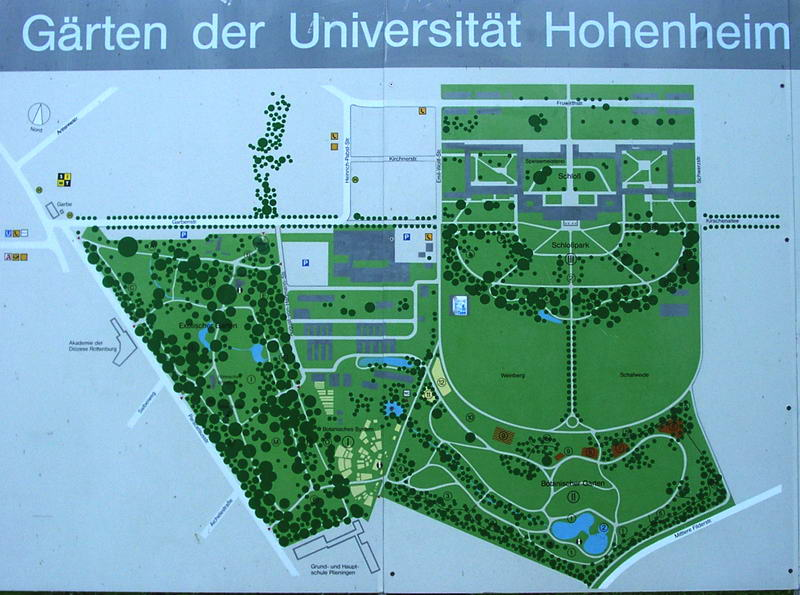
Map of Gardens

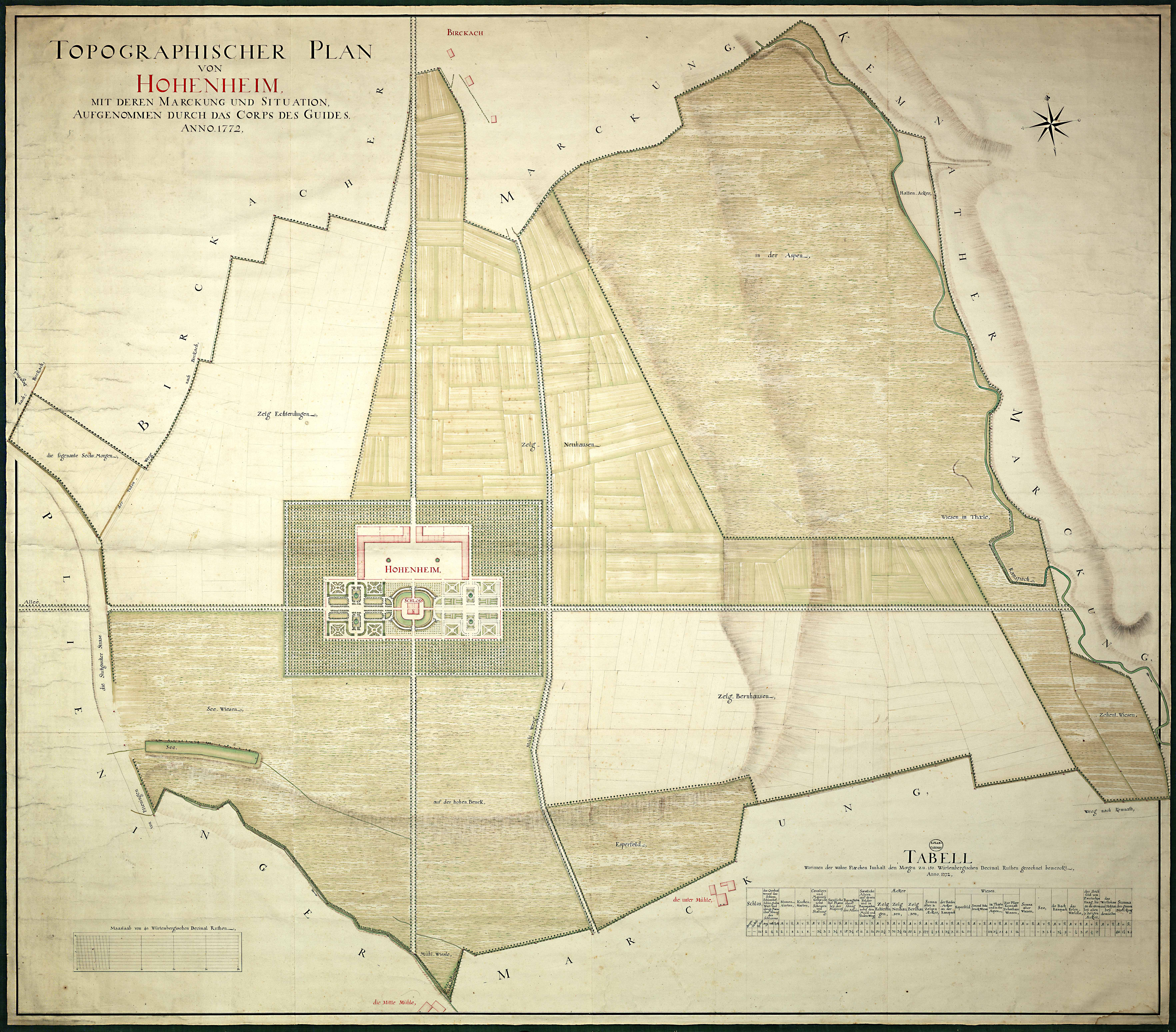
Plan of the Corps of Guides, circa 1772

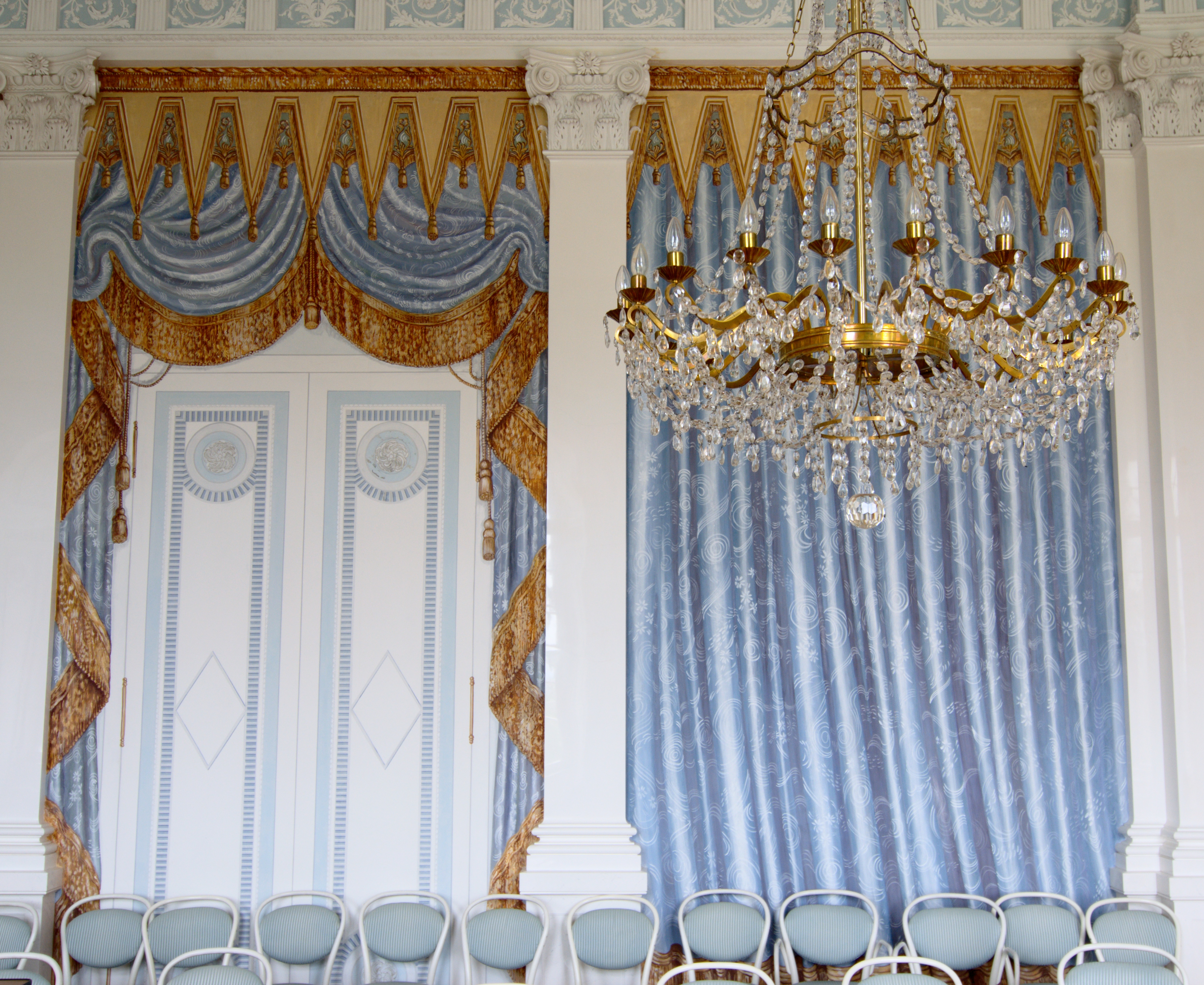
Trompe-l'œil in the interior

== See also ==
- Bombast von Hohenheim

== Bibliography ==
- Steiner, Adolf Martin; Fellmeth, Ulrich; Frisch, Matthias (2008). Hohenheim Gardens. History and Art. Hohenheim. ISBN 978-3-923107-43-8.
