= Philipp Friedrich von Hetsch =

German painter

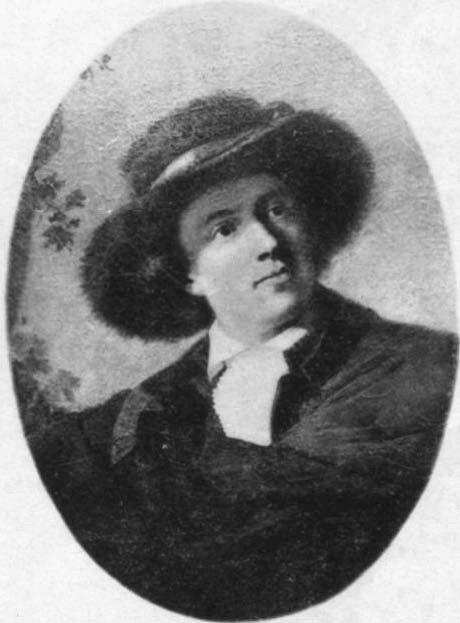
Presumed self-portrait (1787/90)

Philipp Friedrich von Hetsch (10 September 1758 – 31 December 1838) was a German Classical painter, known primarily for his portraits, although he also created historical and mythological scenes.

== Biography ==
Von Hetsch was born in Stuttgart. His father was a musician at the court in Württemberg. At the age of thirteen, without the knowledge of his parents, he applied and was accepted at the Hohe Karlsschule in Stuttgart, where he studied with the painters Nicolas Guibal and Adolf Friedrich Harper. Originally, he focused on landscape painting. His love of the theater brought him into contact and eventually a friendship with Friedrich Schiller.

With the approval of his instructors, at the age of 22, he went to Paris, where he was accepted as a student by Joseph Marie Vien and Claude Joseph Vernet. Later that year, was appointed a court painter to Charles Eugene, Duke of Württemberg. He returned to Stuttgart after two years.

In 1785, with financial support from the court, he was able to undertake further studies in Rome, where he spent time copying the Old Masters. He became a Professor at the Karlsschule in 1790 until the death of Duke Charles, after which the school was disbanded. In 1798, Hetsch was able to replace Harper as the Director of the Ducal Picture Gallery; holding that position until 1816.

In 1808, he was awarded the Knight's Cross of the Order of the Crown, which entitled him to add a non-hereditary "von" to his name.

In 1787, he married Louise Scholl (1766–1800), the daughter of a church councilor. Four of their five children died young. The surviving son Gustav Friedrich Hetsch became an architect. After her death, he married Charlotte Fischer (1778–1826), daughter of the court builder Reinhard Heinrich Ferdinand Fischer. They had one son.

Hetsch died in Stuttgart in 1838.

== Selected portraits ==
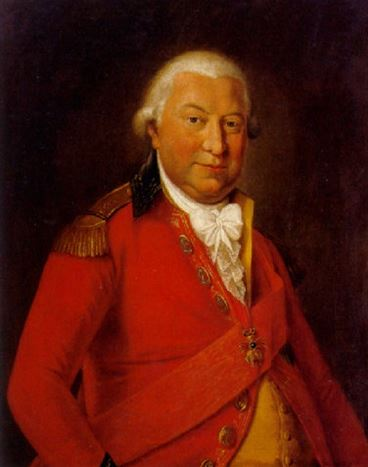
Louis Eugene, Duke of Württemberg

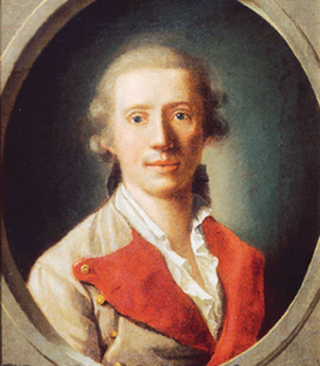
Friedrich Schiller as a Regimental Doctor

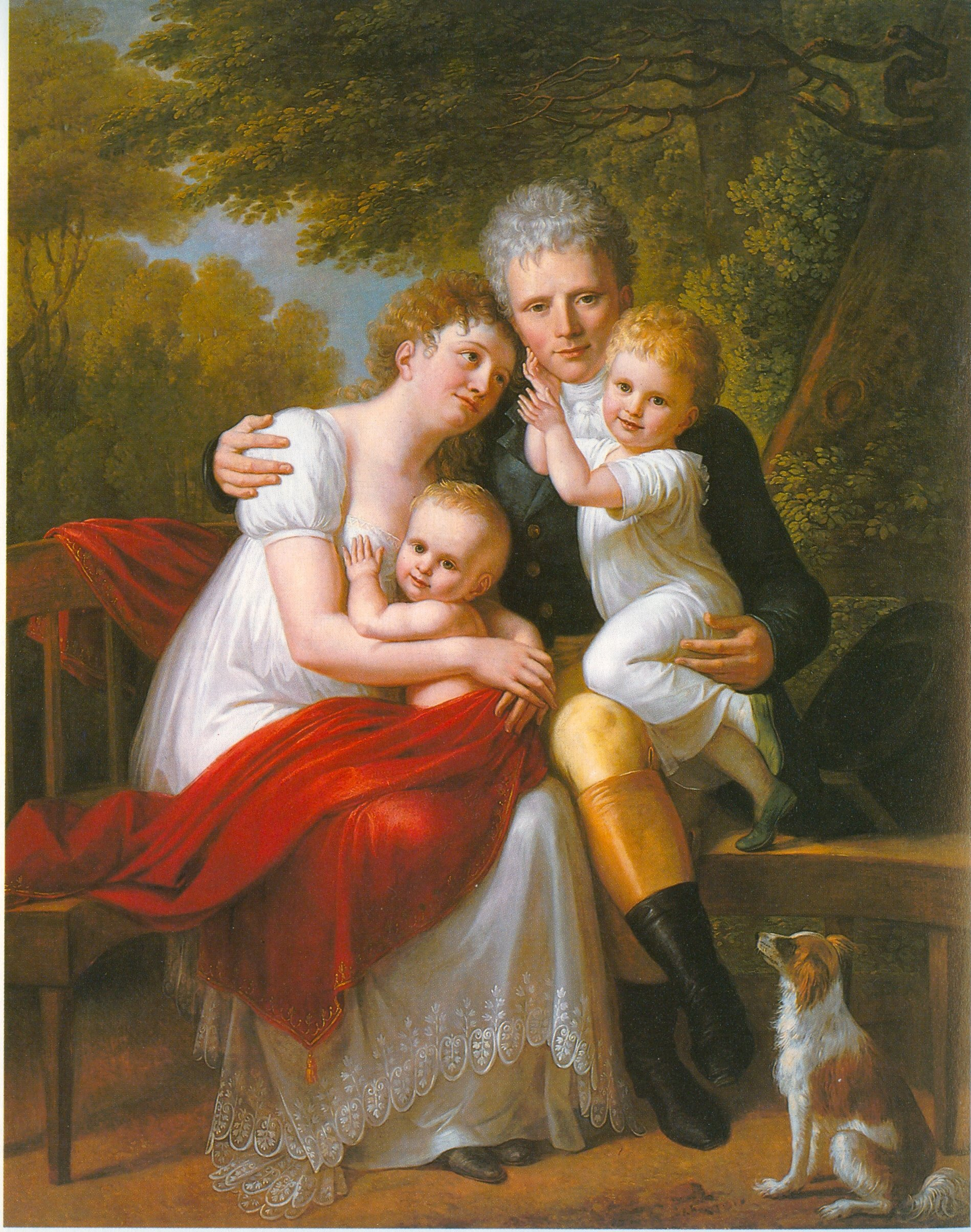
Ferdinand Ludwig von Zeppelin and his Family

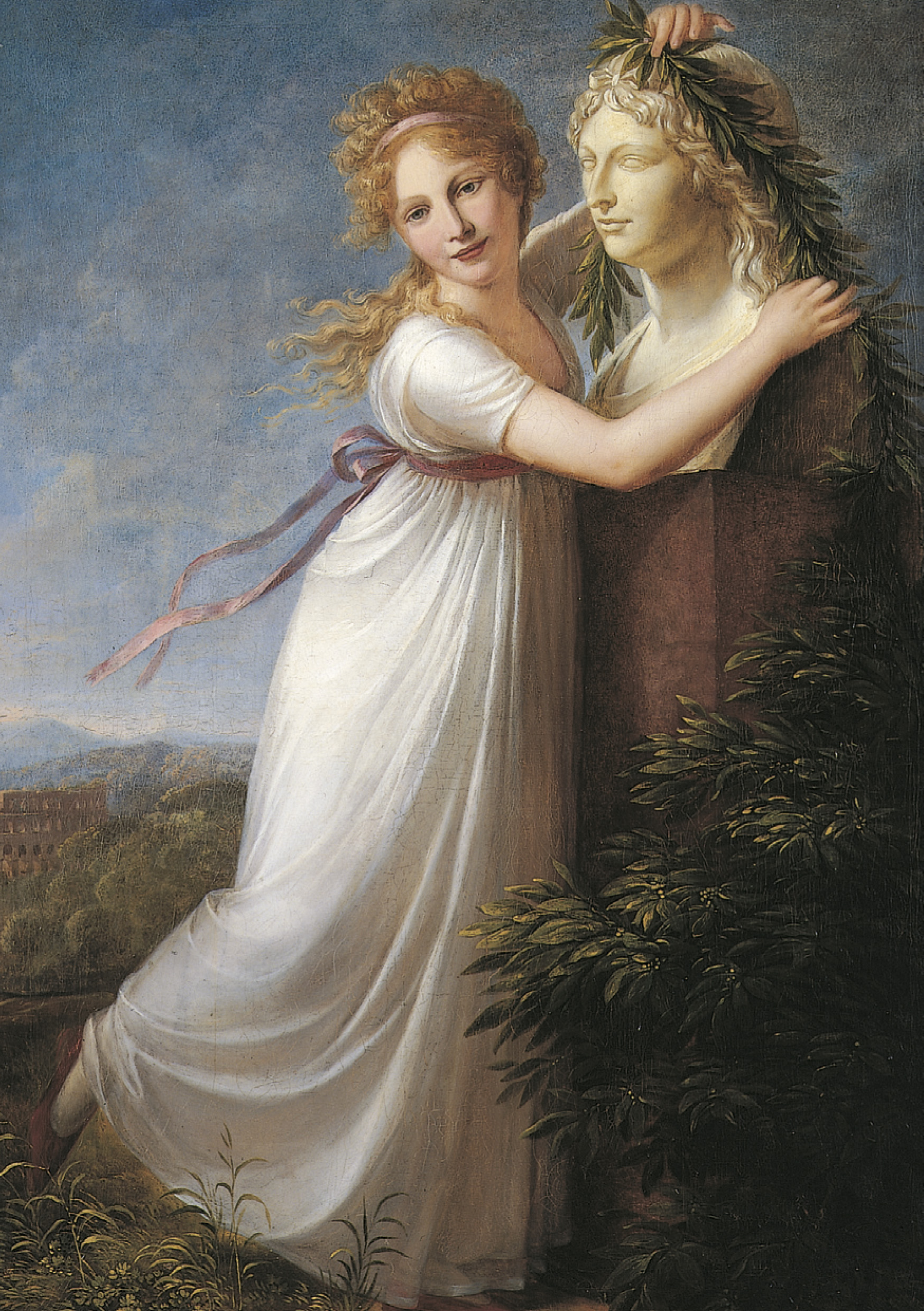
Ida Brun with the Bust of her Mother, Friederike Brun

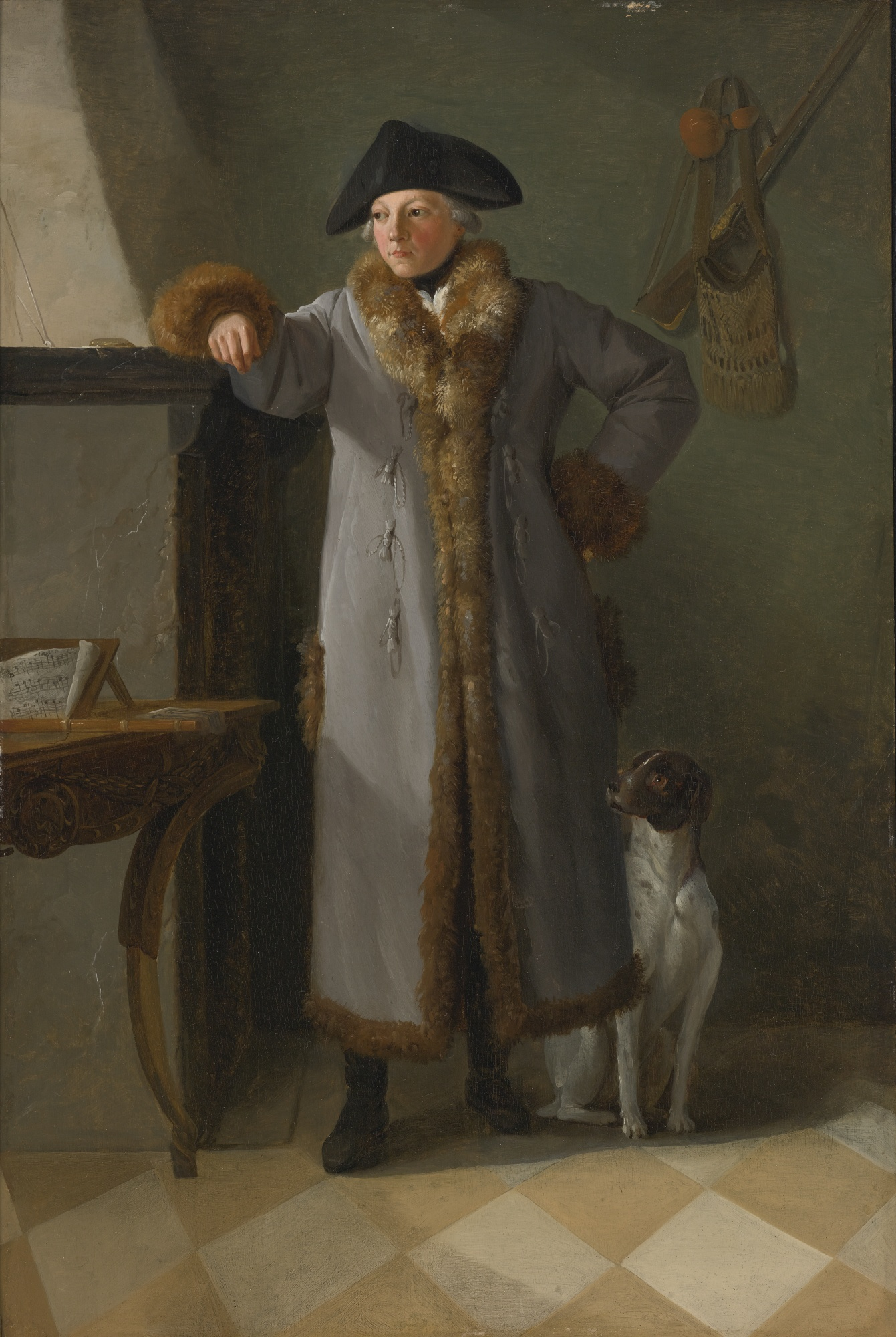
Gottlieb Christian Heigelin as a Hunter
