= Solitude Palace =

German palace

- Schloss Solitude
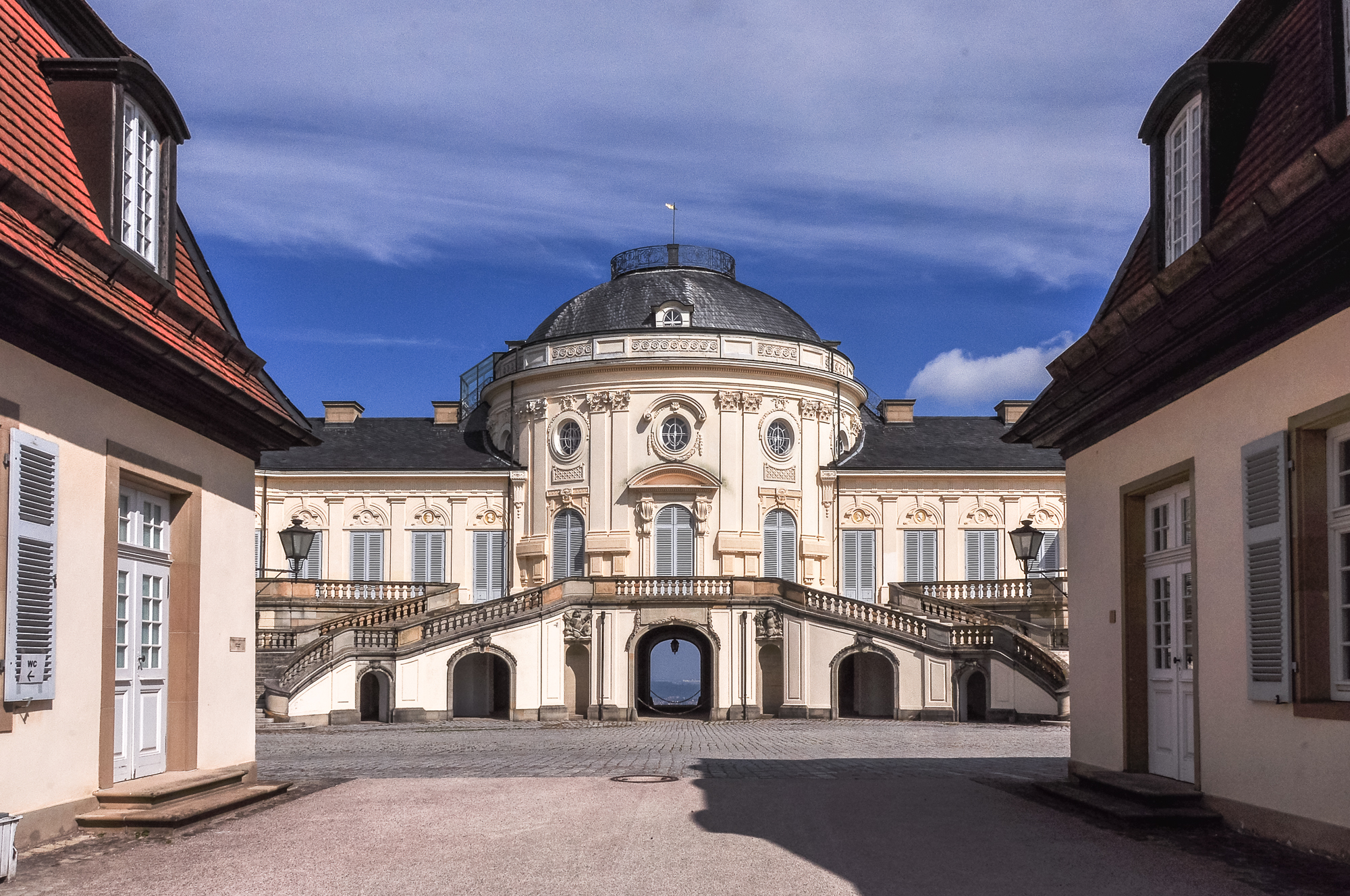
- Southwest facade from between the Cavalier Houses

Map location and basic information
Location within Baden-Württemberg Location within Germany
General information
Location	Stuttgart, Germany
Coordinates	48°47′13″N 9°5′3″E
Construction started	1764
Completed	1769
Renovated	1972–1983
Owner	Baden-Württemberg

Website
- www.schloss-solitude.de

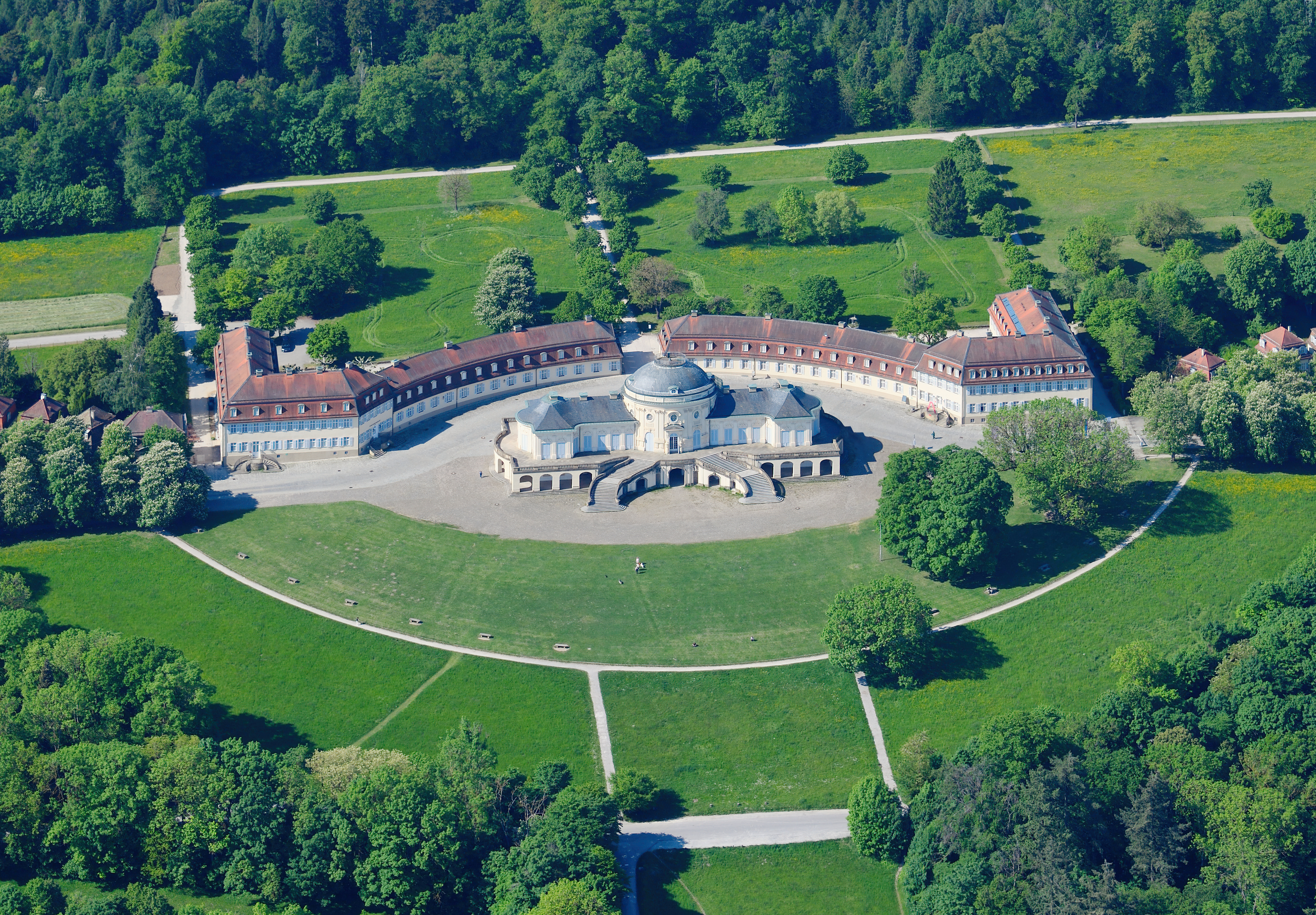
Aerial view of Solitude Palace

Solitude Palace (German: Schloss Solitude) is a Rococo schloss and hunting retreat commissioned by Charles Eugene, Duke of Württemberg. It was designed by Johann Friedrich Weyhing and Philippe de La Guêpière, and constructed from 1764 to 1769. It is located on an elongated ridge between the towns of Leonberg, Gerlingen and Stuttgart in Baden-Württemberg.

== History ==
Charles Eugene von Württemberg succeeded his father Charles Alexander as Duke of Württemberg in 1737, when he was only nine. The Duchy of Württemberg was ruled by a regency council until 1744, when Charles Eugene reached the age of majority at 16. His reign would be marked by economic difficulty, political strife, and extravagance.

By the 1760s, Charles Eugene's policies and ambitions had met with failure. He had failed to achieve increased rank and prestige from the War of the Austrian Succession or the Seven Years' War, and had diplomatically isolated Württemberg because of his jostling and means of acquiring war funds. He had repeatedly withdrawn funding from the construction of his palaces, one of which was Monrepos, in Ludwigsburg. Charles Eugene turned his attention back to Stuttgart and, in 1763, he hired of architects led by Philippe de La Guêpière to plan a new palace that received the name "Solitude". Friedrich Christoph Hemmerling was named head gardener and charged with its design and creation.

=== Construction ===
Priority during construction went towards the two wings next to the palatial building until they were completed in 1766. It was from these that the Duke closely monitored construction.

La Guêpière departed from Württemberg for his native Paris in 1768. He was succeeded as court architect and as director of construction at Solitude by his student, Reinhard Heinrich Ferdinand Fischer.

In 1770, Charles Eugene established the Hohe Karlsschule on the grounds of Solitude Palace. It was at this school that Friedrich Schiller studied in his youth and wrote The Robbers. The school moved into Stuttgart in 1775, the same year the Duke himself shifted his attention to nearby Hohenheim Palace in 1775. The last grand function held at Solitude took place in 1782, after which maintenance of the grounds ceased. From the 1830s, however, King Charles I renovated the palace, while Queen Olga met with her relatives in the palace.

=== Post-monarchy ===
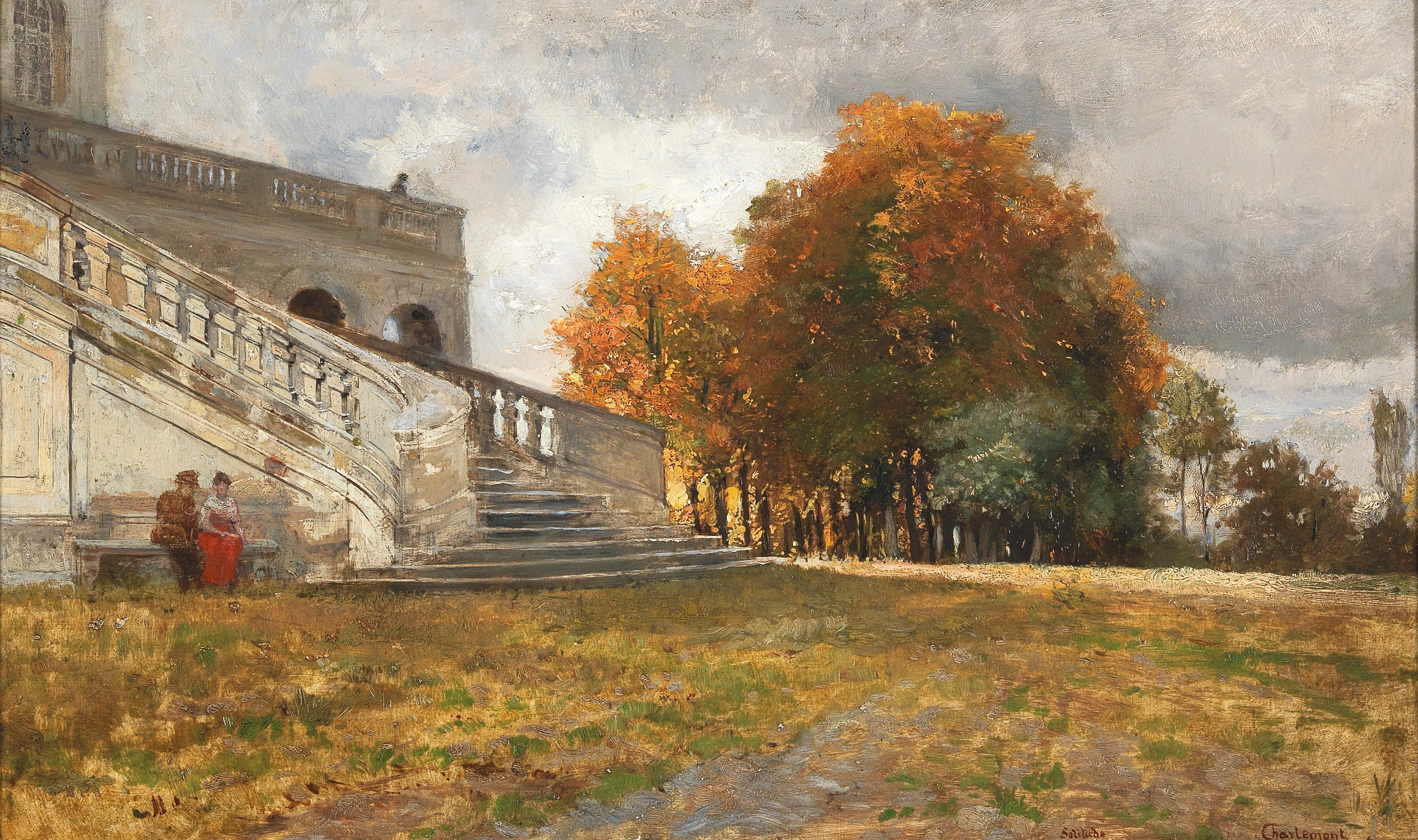
Resting at the Steps, by Hugo Charlemont

Solitude was abandoned in the 20th century, the gardens fell into disrepair, and the ceiling frescoes by Nicolas Guibal were largely destroyed by water damage. The palace was used in times of war as a military hospital; during World War I, 23 soldiers died on its grounds. Between 1972 and 1983, the government of Baden-Württemberg restored the palace's interiors. From May 1968 to 1986, an autonomous dorm was located in today's academy building. Many of the residents were musicians, actors and dancers, as well as social workers, architects and engineers. Professor K.R.H. Sonderborg from the Stuttgart Art Academy, the conductor Manfred Schreier and the actress Bettina Kupfer were frequent guests.

== Grounds and architecture ==
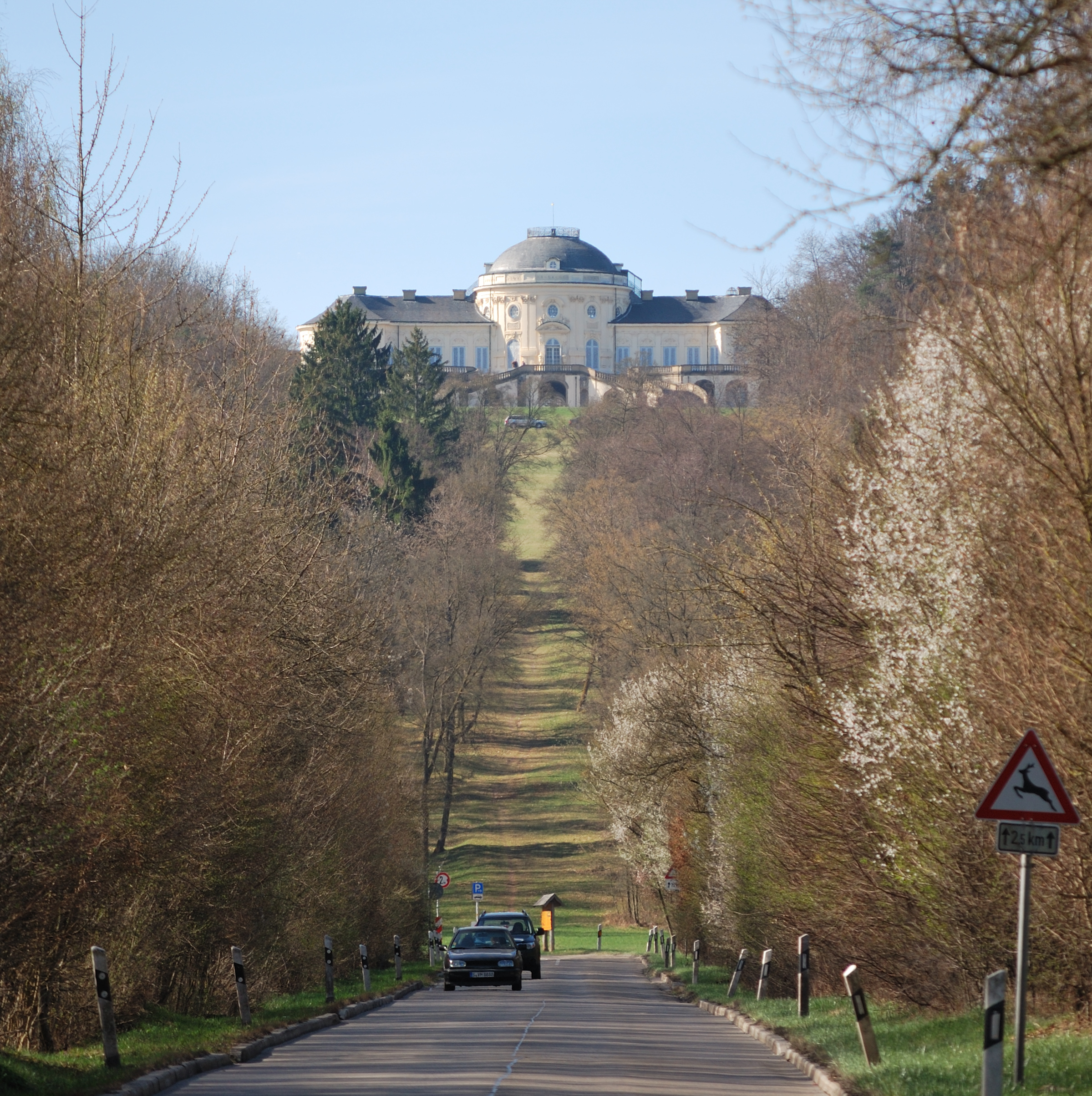
The palace seen from the northeast, on the Solitude Avenue

Solitude Palace's complex is made up by a primary palatial structure, two outbuildings, and some avenues. There was also an extensive garden, laid out by Friedrich Christoph Hemmerling along preexisting paths. Reinhard Heinrich Ferdinand Fischer drew up plans for massive expansions to the garden and palace complex from 1766 to 1772 that closely followed the principles of French horticulturalist Antoine-Joseph Dezallier d'Argenville. The south garden was used for the entertainment of residents and visitors to Solitude and offered a hedge maze, theater, orangery, riding hall, a chinoiserie house, and zoos. The surrounding forests were carefully manicured to facilitate the parforce style of coursing. The grounds were allowed to fall into disrepair from 1770 onward.

Castle Solitude was designed by a working group at the ducal court led Philippe de La Guêpière, though Charles Eugene was actively involved in the planning. The Duke desired the palace to be designed in the Rococo style, like his earlier project at Schloss Favorite. By 1763, however, the Rococo style had gone out of vogue in favor of Neoclassical architecture, and Solitude's interiors reflect this.

At first, Charles Eugene intended to build an unassuming hunting retreat. He later changed his mind, and construction would last seven years and cost around a million florins. Construction was directed by La Guêpière and Johann Friedrich Weyhing.

From 1764 and 1768, Charles Eugene constructed the Solitude Avenue, a 13-kilometre (8.1 mi) long road from Solitude Palace to Ludwigsburg and its palace. Use of the Avenue was reserved for the royal household. In 1820, the Avenue became the standard reference for measuring distance in the Kingdom of Württemberg.

=== Main building ===
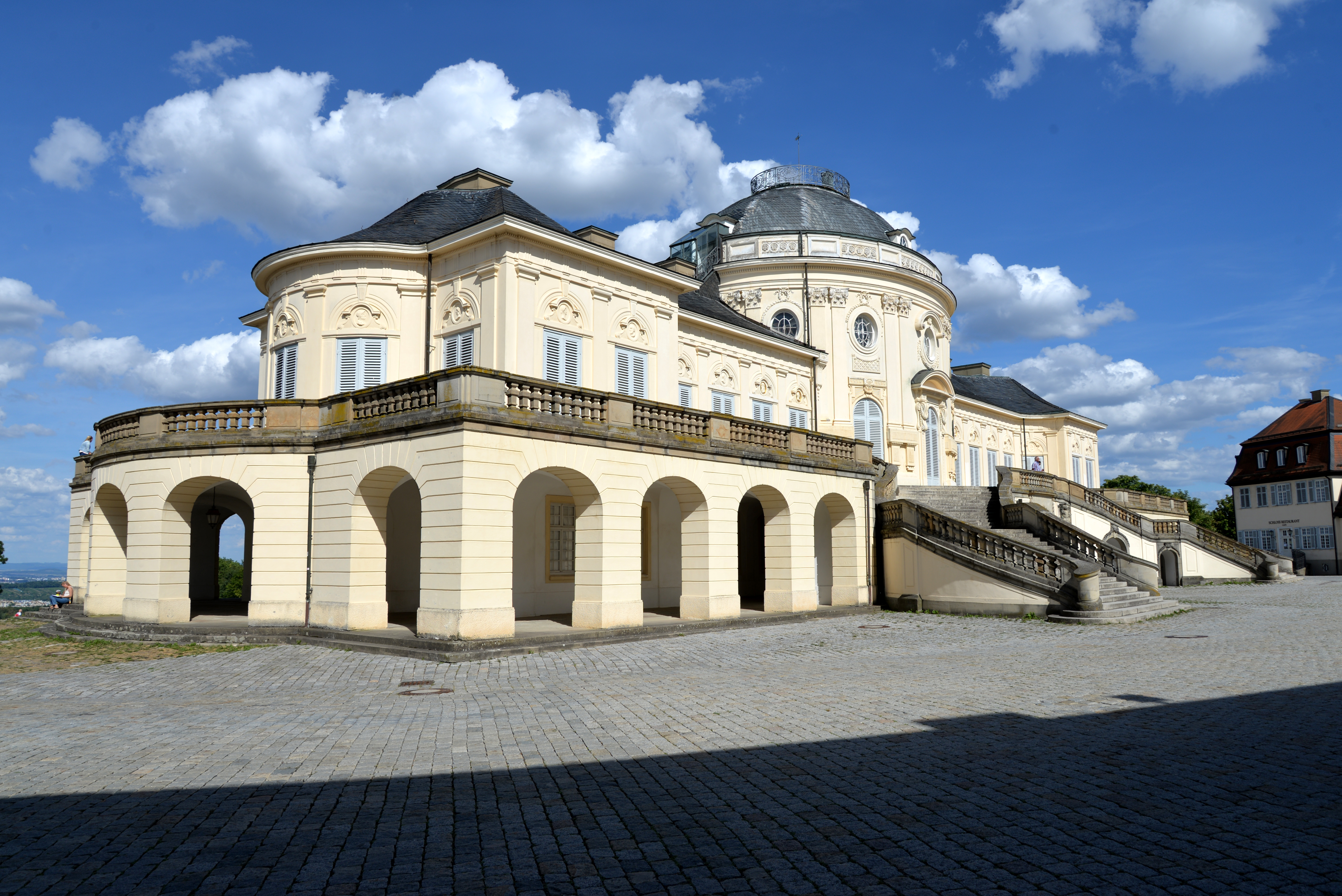
Palatial building, looking south

The main palatial building follows a standard Rococo plan, consisting of a large, oval-shaped hall with two halls that end in a pavilion. It is surrounded by a terrace supported on a series of arches that rises to the beletage, with a belvedere and staircases on either side. The center of the building is the White Hall, whose walls are clad in stucco marble and passed through via six French doors, flanked by Corinthian columns. The stucco work, by Valentin Sonnenschein, Johann Adam Bauer, and Ludovico Bossi, is made up by oval-shaped windows connected by flowery garlands and topped by trophies of arms and frescoes. Above the north and south entrances into the White Hall are, respectively, the coat of arms of the Duchy of Württemberg and those of Duke Charles Eugene. The ceiling fresco was painted around 1768 by Nicolas Guibal and glorifies Charles Eugene's reign with personified virtues, flanking the Ducal coronet, triumphing over their inverse aspect as Greco-Roman deities represent highlights of the Duke's reign. Peace overcomes War, Bacchus and Ceres hold grapevines to symbolize local viticulture, and Apollo, leading various forms of art personified, celebrates Württemberg's cultural achievements. On top of the cupola is a viewing platform accessed by a hidden staircase in the north end of the White Hall. Some stone cartouches bearing statements from Charles Eugene are also found on the lower facade of the main building.

Immediately to the west of the White Hall is the six rooms of the Ducal Apartment, which was used for impressing visitors. The first is an antechamber decorated with green and gold-painted stuccowork. Following this is the Marble Hall, the only room of the suite in the Neoclassical style and where Charles Eugene greeted guests, which leads into the Palm Room, so named for the golden stucco palm trees that frame its windows. The Palm Room serves as the entrance to the bedroom, to the south and decorated like the antechamber, and to two cabinets to the north. The first of the latter is the Writing Cabinet, painted in shades of gray and ornamented with more golden stucco. The second, and smaller, is the Library Cabinet, whose walls are painted in a mimicry of woodgrain.

The east wing consists of drawing rooms for visitors, namely two halls and four cabinets. The first room is the Assembly Room, painted blue and decorated with more golden stucco, and spanning the entire width of the building. Beyond is the Music Room, painted white and decorated with mirrors, yet more stucco, and overdoors painted by court painter Adolf Friedrich Harper. Attached to the Music Room are four themed cabinets: the Picture, Red, Green, and Yellow Cabinets. The Picture Cabinet displays over 30 landscape paintings on its wall panels.

The "basement" of the main building is divided exactly in half by and entered through an oval chamber directly beneath the White Hall. The walls of this chamber are covered with more trophies of arms. After 1771, the apartments were made up by a loggia, a vestibule, two cabinets, and a bedroom.

=== Wings ===
Adjacent to the palatial building are two semicircular buildings. The Western Wing contained amenities, while the Eastern was the actual royal apartment. The Duke resided on the ground floor, and his mistress on the second floor with the ducal chapel. An additional ten houses were built on either end of the wings. Since 1990, these buildings have housed the Akademie Schloss Solitude. The Graevenitz Museum, displaying works by the Stuttgart sculptor Fritz von Graevenitz, is also located here.

The palace chapel was constructed in a combination of the Rococo and Neoclassical styles. It is painted white in its entirety, except for the fresco on the flat ceiling painted by Guibal in 1766, and paired columns flank each window. Just above the columns, on the cornices are putti wielding the Arma Christi. At the chapel's entrance is the Ducal box, part of Charles Eugene's suite.

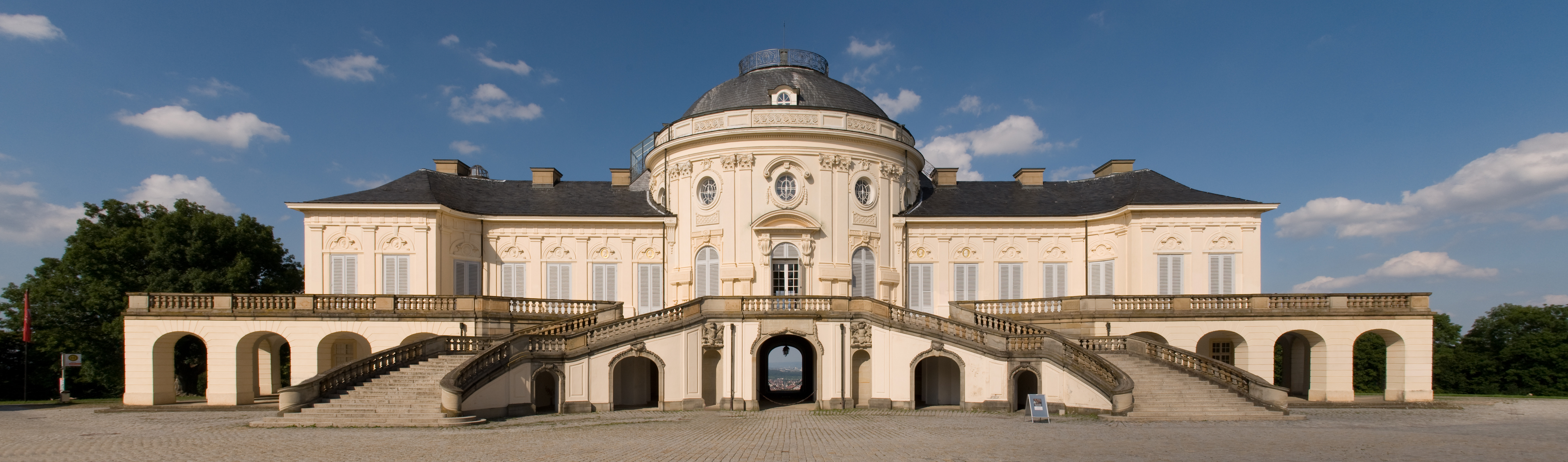
The palace from the southeast

== In popular culture ==
American journalist and traitor Jane Anderson and two others stay at an abandoned Schloss Solitude during the Second World War in the novel The War Begins in Paris (published by Little, Brown & Co. in 2023.)

== See also ==
- New Palace (Stuttgart)
- Ludwigsburg Palace
- Einsiedel Palace
- Hohenheim Palace
- Solitude Racetrack
- Solituderennen
