= Adolf Friedrich Harper =

German landscape painter

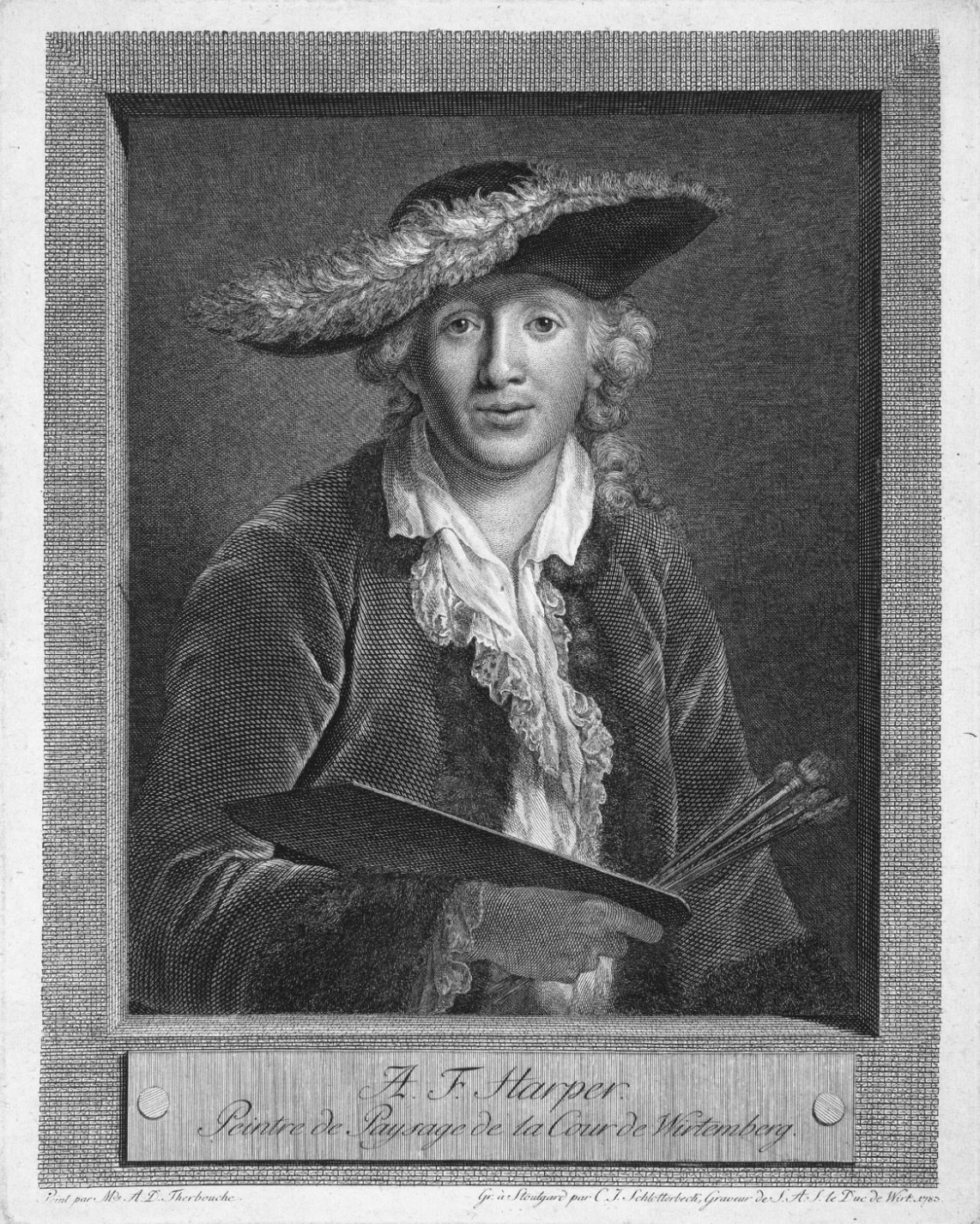
- 1783 portrait by Jakob Christian Schlotterbeck
- Born: 17 October 1725; Berlin, Kingdom of Prussia
- Died: 23 June 1806 (aged 80); Berlin
- Occupation: Landscape painter

Adolf Friedrich Harper (born 17 October 1725, Berlin — d. 23 June 1806, Berlin) was a German landscape painter.

== Biography ==
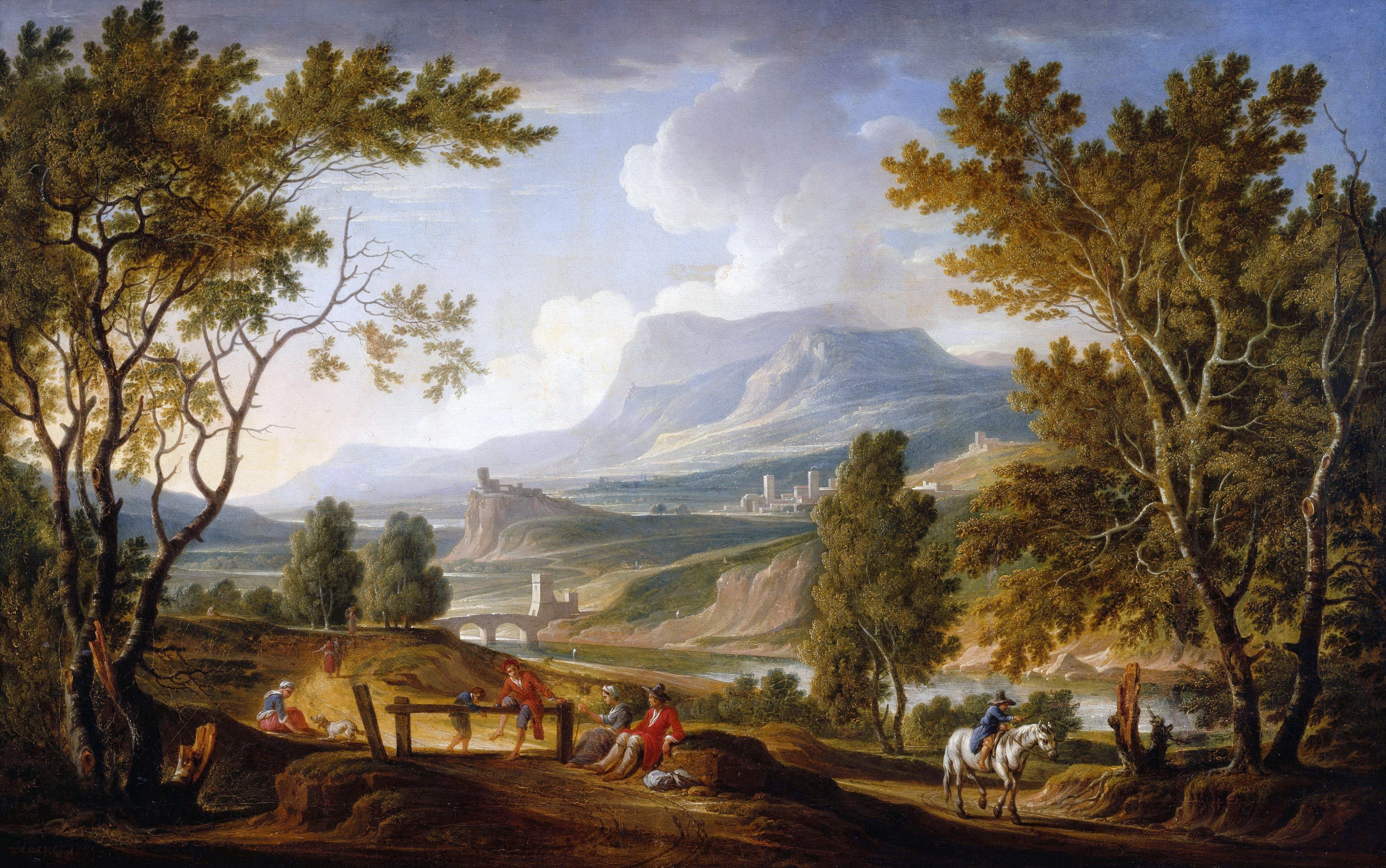
Italian Landscape, painted in 1798

Adolf Friedrich Harper was born in Berlin on 17 October 1725 to the Swedish-born Prussian court painter Johann Harper. After his father's death, Harper visited France and Italy, where he studied landscape painting under Richard Wilson. Harper first found employment in Württemberg in 1756. Three years later, he was made court painter to Duke Charles Eugene, who also made Harper the director of his Academy of Fine Arts at the Karlsschule in 1761. In 1798, Harper retired from court and spent his last years in his hometown, Berlin.

Like Reinhard Heinrich Ferdinand Fischer and Nicolas Guibal, and other young artists sponsored by Charles Eugene, Harper had many commissions to fulfill and was constantly behind on them. Harper, whom Goethe called a "born landscape artist", was tasked with painting overdoors, studies of fruits and flowers, theater decorations, and frescoes with Guibal.

Harper died in Berlin on 23 June 1806.

== Legacy ==
Since the presidency of Christian Wulff, Harper's Italian Landscape has hung on the wall behind the desk of the President of Germany.

== See also ==
- Reinhard Heinrich Ferdinand Fischer
- Nicolas Guibal
