= Philippe de La Guêpière =

18th century French architect

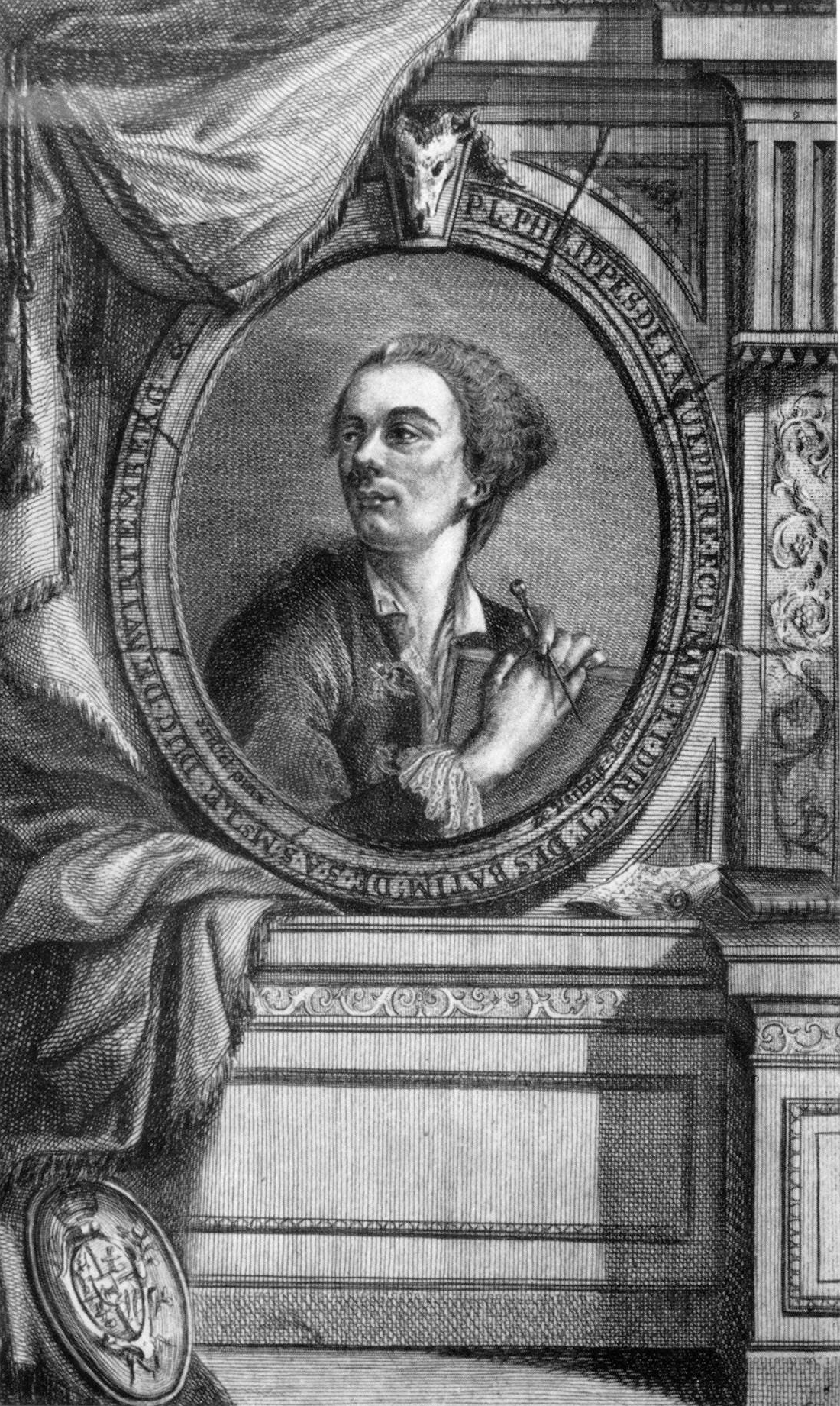
Portrate of Philippe de La Guêpière, 1752

(Pierre Louis) Philippe de La Guêpière (c. 1715 – 30 October 1773) was an 18th-century French architect whose main commissions were from Karl Eugen, Duke of Württemberg.

== Early life ==
Philippe was born in Sceaux, Hauts-de-Seine, south of Paris, the son of Lucien de La Guêpière, clerk of the works at the château de Sceaux, where the architect employed by Louis XIV's natural son, the duc du Maine, had been his uncle, Jacques de La Guêpière (1670–1734).

Apparently having followed the architectural courses of the theoretician Jacques-François Blondel, from the 1730s La Guêpière took courses in architecture in Paris. He attended the Académie royale d'architecture. In 1750 he issued his engraved folio volume Plans, coupes et élévations de différents palais et églises. That same year Leopoldo Retti, who was engaged in building the Neues Schloss in Stuttgart for Karl Eugen, made an artistic reconnoitering trip to Paris, in the company of the duke's garden designer Hemmerling. In Paris he oversaw the engraving of a suite of four folio sheets of the floorplan, section, elevations and profiles of the schloss that was being built. In Paris he may have encountered La Guêpière. At any rate, in 1752 Karl Eugen named La Guêpière architect to his court of Württemberg, to fill the post left empty by the unexpected death of Retti, in September the previous year.

La Guêpière was one of the group of French-trained architects, like François de Cuvilliés in Munich, who brought the latest French style to the small German courts. He was occupied with works at the ducal Residenz of Stuttgart, the Neues Schloss that was built adjacent to the former palace, and also at that of Karlsruhe. He was also responsible for the palatial retreat Schloss Solitude near Stuttgart and the waterside Schloss of Monrepos in the grounds of Ludwigsburg (1760–64).

== In Stuttgart ==
At Stuttgart La Guêpière lost little time in engraving and publishing further designs. His Recueil de différens projets d’architecture représentant plusieurs monuments publics et autres (Stuttgart, Jean Nicolas Stoll) was published on 11 December 1752. Like his Paris engravings, it broke with earlier traditions of architectural treatises by featuring just the works of a single architect (Klaiber).

La Guêpière's work at the Stuttgart Neues Schloss was never completed. By 1756 the shell of the wing that faced the city was completed, the central Mittelbau erected and the interior decoration in the garden wing was complete. First the garden wing was destroyed by fire in 1762, then Karl Eugen faced opposition over his extravagance and abandoned Stuttgart for Ludwigsburg. The Neues Schloss was bombed to ruin in World War II and has been rebuilt as a shell with modern interiors and some reproduced reception rooms.

At Ludwigsburg Palace, the alternate seat of the duke, La Guêpière was occupied in 1757–1758, in providing a court theater and in refurbishing the main block of the palace. Here the palace was not badly damaged in World War II. The theatre retains its stage machinery constructed under the direction of La Guêpière, the oldest surviving stage machinery preserved in Europe. The water pavilion Monrepos was built from 1755 and completed in 1764 [Hlawtsch 1991].

== Return to Paris ==
He left Württemberg in 1768, with Schloss Solitude almost completed, to return to Paris, where he was one of the first architects to turn away from Rococo, developing his style towards the Goût grec the "Greek taste' that was the early forerunner of neoclassicism. His folio volume Recueil d'esquisses d'architecture was issued from Paris in 1765.

La Guêpière was the architect of the neoclassical Hôtel de Ville in Montbéliard in Franche-Comté, where his patron Karl Eugen was stathouder. The corps de logis of the château was also rebuilt in a more stylish and commodious fashion.

His works in France include interiors (since replaced) for the former bibliothèque Sainte-Geneviève. A pavilion to contain a menagerie at the Château de Sceaux, sometimes credited to him, was built by Jacques de La Guêpière.

He died in Paris.

The only monograph devoted to La Guêpière is Hans Andreas Klaiber's Der Württembergische Oberbaudirektor Philippe de La Guêpière: Ein Beitrag zur Kunstgeschichte der Architektur am Ende des Spätbarock, published in Stuttgart in 1959.
