= Hôtel de Ville, Montbéliard =

Town hall in Montbéliard, France

Hôtel de Ville
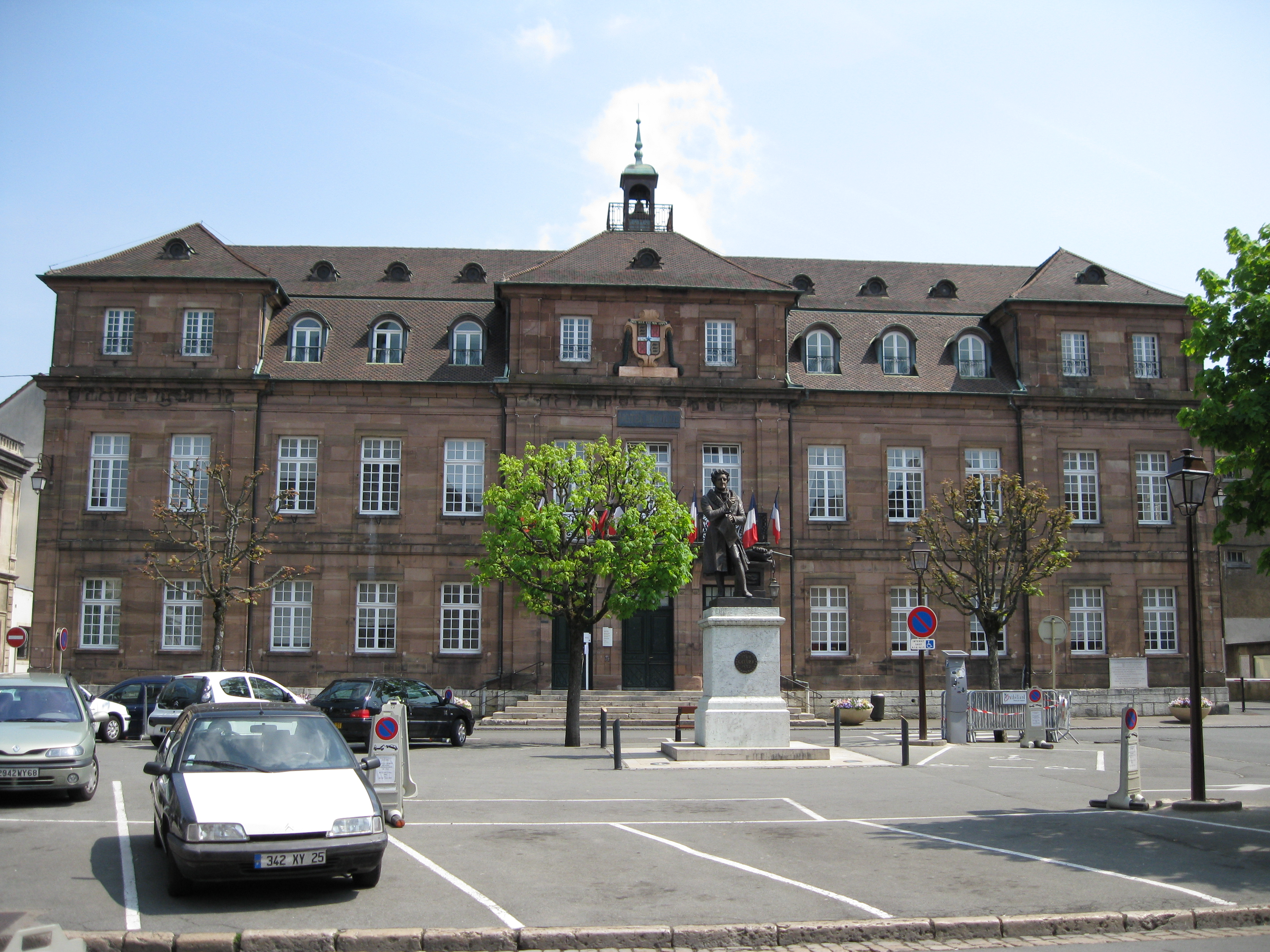
- The main frontage of the Hôtel de Ville in May 2009

General information
- Type: City hall
- Architectural style: Neoclassical style
- Location: Montbéliard, France
- Coordinates: 47.5102°N 6.7983°E
- Completed: 1778

Design and construction
- Architect: Philippe de La Guêpière

Monument historique
- Official name: Hôtel de ville
- Type: Inscrit
- Designated: 1939
- Reference no.: PA00101677

The Hôtel de Ville (French pronunciation: [otɛl də vil], City Hall) is a municipal building in Montbéliard, Doubs, eastern France, standing on Rue de l'Hôtel de Ville. The building was designated a monument historique by the French government in 1939.

== History ==
The first town hall in Montbéliard was completed around 1470. By the mid-19th century, the old building was dilapidated and local civic leaders decided to demolish it and to erect a new town hall on the same site. After the demolition had been completed, a foundation stone for the new building was laid by the local magistrate at the southwest corner of the building on 23 May 1776. A further foundation stone was laid at the northeast corner of the building in the presence of the young sons of Frederick II Eugene, Duke of Württemberg on 12 September 1776. The building was designed by Philippe de La Guêpière in the neoclassical style, built in dark sandstone from Vosges at a cost of 80,000 French livre, and was officially opened in time for the council meeting on 13 November 1778.

The design of the new building involved a symmetrical main frontage of 13 bays, with the central section of three bays and the end sections of two bays each, slightly projected forward as pavilions. These sections were flanked by pilasters supporting the pavilion roofs. The central section featured a short flight of steps leading up to three panelled doorways flanked by brackets supporting a balcony with fine iron railings. On the second floor, in the central bay, there was a heraldic shield with the town's coat of arms surmounted by a scroll inscribed the town's motto "Dieu seul est mon appuy" ("God alone is my support"). At roof level, there was a small belfry: the bell was inscribed with the message "Ave Maria gracia plena Dominus tecum benedicta tu in mulieribus" ("Hail Mary, full of grace, may the Lord be with you, blessed are you among women"). The other bays on the ground floor, all bays on the first floor and all bays on the second floor in the pavilion sections were fenestrated with casement windows, while the bays on the second floor in the connecting sections were fenestrated with dormer windows. Stained glass windows depicting the royal coat of arms and town's coat of arms were recovered from the old town hall and installed in the new building.

The Grand Duke of Russia, Pavel Petrovich, visited the town hall and attended a banquet, hosted by the local magistrate, in 1782. Pavel also made donations to the local hospital and local civic charity. A bronze statue of the naturalist and zoologist, Georges Cuvier, was installed in front of the building on 23 August 1835. A theatre with seating for 500 people, designed by Auguste Goguel, was installed at the back of the complex in 1858. The interior design in the theatre was carried out by Charles-Antoine Cambon and Joseph François Désiré Thierry.

At the end of the First World War, a plaque was installed on the façade of the building inscribed with the words "Les Armées et leurs chefs, Le Gouvernement de la République, le Citoyen Georges Clemenceau, président du conseil, ministre de la guerre, le Maréchal Foch, généralissime des armées alliées, ont bien mérité de la patrie" ("The Armies and their leaders, The Government of the Republic, Citizen Georges Clemenceau, President of the Council, Minister of War, Marshal Foch, Generalissimo of the Allied Armies, deserve the praise of the fatherland").

After the Second World War, another plaque was installed inscribed with the words "La première Armée Français commandée par le general de Lattre de Tassigny forgée en Afrique et en Italie débarquée en Provence grossie des forces Français de l'intérieur a libérée Montbéliard le 17 Novembre 1944 dans sa marche de la victoire tout Rhin et Danube" ("The First French Army, commanded by General de Lattre de Tassigny raised in Africa and in Italy, landed in Provence, augmented by the French Forces of the Interior, liberated Montbéliard on 17 November 1944 during its victory march throughout the Rhine and Danube").

== Sources ==
- Duvernoy, Charles (1832). Ephémérides du comté de Montbéliard. Charles Deis.
