= New Palace, Stuttgart =

Castle in Stuttgart, Germany

New Palace of Stuttgart
- Neues Schloss
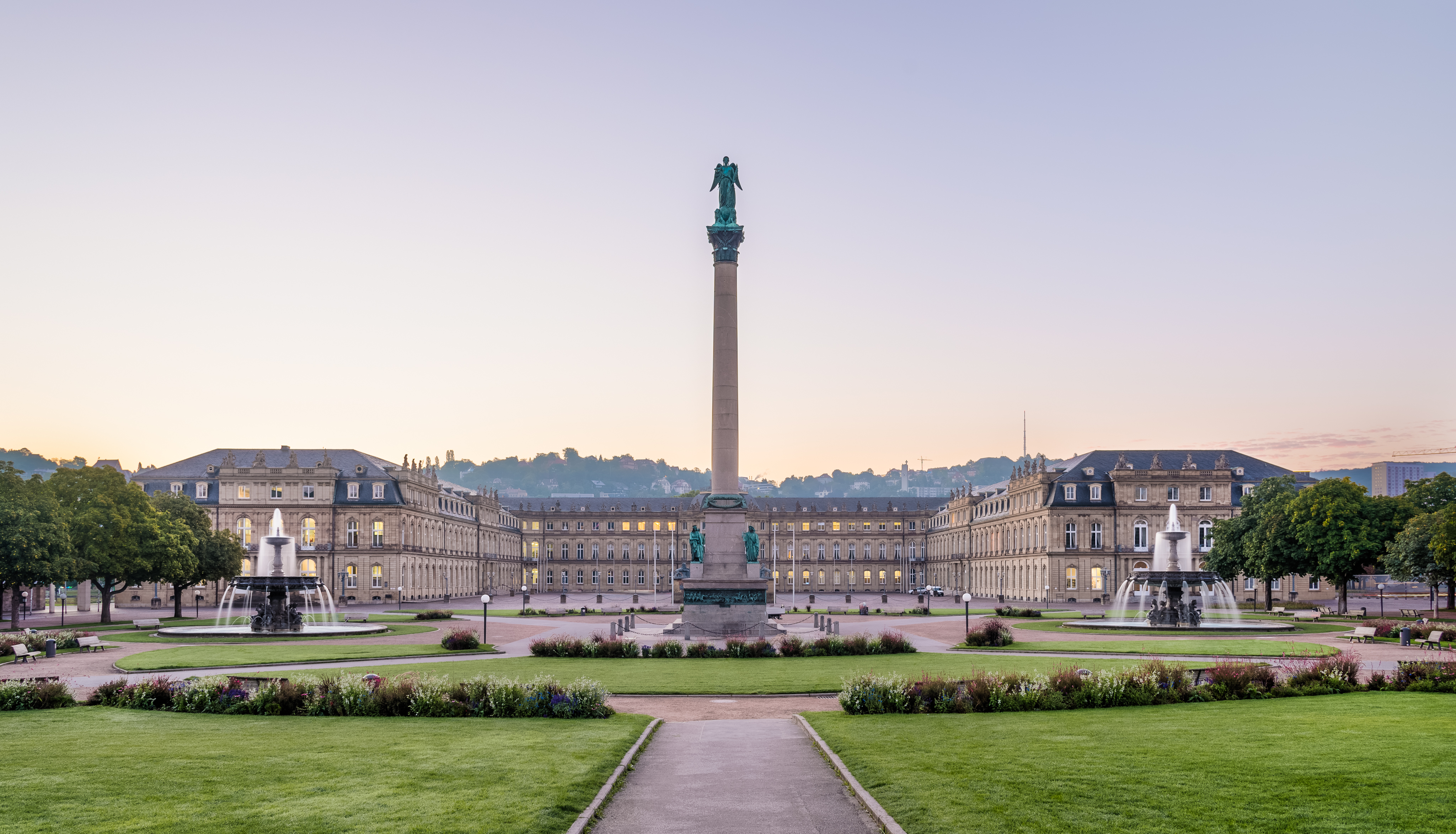
- From the Garden

- Location within Baden-Württemberg Location within Germany

General information
- Architectural style: Baroque
- Location: Stuttgart-Center, Baden-Württemberg, Stuttgart Schlossplatz 4, 70173 Stuttgart, Stuttgart, Germany
- Coordinates: 48°46′41″N 9°10′55″E
- Current tenants: Baden-Württemberg Ministries of Finance and Economy
- Groundbreaking: 1746
- Completed: 1807
- Renovated: 1958 to 1964
- Demolished: 1944
- Cost: 600,000 florins
- Client: Duke Charles Eugene of Württemberg
- Owner: Baden-Württemberg

Design and construction
- Architects: Nikolaus Friedrich Thouret, Leopoldo Retti, Philippe de La Guêpière, Reinhard Heinrich Ferdinand Fischer
- Known for: Residence of the dukes and kings of Württemberg

Other information
- Number of rooms: 365+

Website
- www.neues-schloss-stuttgart.de

The New Palace (German: Neues Schloss) is an 18th-century Baroque palace in Stuttgart and is one of the last large city palaces built in Southern Germany. The palace is located on the Schlossplatz in front of the Jubiläumssäule column and Königsbau. Public tours of the building are only permitted by special arrangement, as the building contains some government offices. Once a historic residence of the kings of Württemberg, (Note: It often exchanged being the seat of power for the dukes and then kings of the Württemberg with the palace in the nearby town of Ludwigsburg.) the New Palace derives its name from its commissioning by Duke Carl Eugen of Württemberg to replace the Old Castle in the early years of his reign. Originally, Charles commissioned Nikolaus Friedrich Thouret, but architects Leopoldo Retti, Philippe de La Guêpière, Reinhard Heinrich Ferdinand Fischer would contribute to the design, history, and construction of the palace.

The palace was heavily bombed in World War II, leaving only a shell. It was finally agreed to rebuild it in 1957.

== History ==
=== Background ===
In 1737, then Duke of Württemberg Charles Alexander died leaving his nine year old son Charles Eugene as duke prematurely. He was not yet old enough to rule the Duchy, so he was sent to be educated and study in the court of then King of Prussia Frederick the Great while the court of Württemberg was run by magistrates. In 1744, Charles Eugene came of age at 16 years old, and returned to Stuttgart to assume his throne. Upon arriving, he desired a new and proper residence which would be "convenable to his royal dignity and the amplitude of his royal household" in the city of Stuttgart and even threatened to move the capital back out of Stuttgart to Ludwigsburg Palace. The Württemberg Diet, who had lost the traditional role of capital of the Duchy for decades to the smaller and unfortified Ludwigsburg, insisted that the palace and seat of the power be moved back into Stuttgart because it would mean increased pride and political and economic power coming to rest in the city once again. So it was that Charles Eugene decided to build his palace upon the Schlossplatz.

However, there was some debate over the palace as the Duchy already had the large and expensive residence at Ludwigsburg, and some, like Württemberg's Oberbaudirektor Johann Christoph David Leger, argued that expansion of a previous residence like the Old Castle would suffice. (Note: In addition, the idea that a single duchy should need two ducal residences was an alien one.) Plans nonetheless went forward, and architects across Europe jumped at the chance to design the Duke's palace and submitted drafts directly to Charles, including renowned architects Alessandro Galli da Bibiena and Maurizio Pedetti as well as Balthasar Neumann, designer of the world-famous Würzburg Residence.

=== Construction ===
On 3 September 1746 the cornerstone was laid under the New Palace's first build master, Leopoldo Retti whose uncle, Donato Giuseppe Frisoni, had worked on Ludwigsburg Palace. Retti, who picked the site of an old crossbow shop for the New Palace, planned for the courtyard to face the nearby Karlsschule Stuttgart and New Lusthaus south of the palace, the Garden Wing to face the Ducal Apartments in the Corps de logis, and for the City Wing to contain the guest and state rooms. However, when construction began, it began under the direction of Johann Christoph David Leger as Retti was working on a commission in Ansbach until 1748. The following year, the facades of the Corps de logis and Garden Wing were completed, while work on the interiors would last until 1750. Unfortunately, Retti, whose work had been inspired by the Baroque architecture of France, died of an unknown illness 18 September 1751.

After Retti's death, construction of the palace fell to Parisian architect Philippe de La Guêpière, a friend of Retti. A connoisseur of then modern architectural theory, Philippe was inspired by his time in his native France and especially the magnificent Palace of Versailles, and took the palace in this direction. Under La Guêpière, the City Wing facade was finished in 1756 as well as a dome over the central structure in 1760 with decorations to the Corp de logis following in 1762. Unfortunately, a fire destroyed the interior of the Garden Wing, which La Guêpière had just finished, on the night of 13–14 November of that same year. Following the fire, an annoyed Charles Eugene decreed the speedy conclusion of construction of the White Room and Mirror Gallery for the celebration of his birthday (11 February) the following year. In 1764, construction ceased because the Duke moved his residence to Ludwigsburg and remained there for a decade. In response, La Guêpière left the Duke's court in 1768 and returned to Paris.

In 1775, the Duke returned to Stuttgart and hired Reinhard Heinrich Ferdinand Fischer to repair the palace. He would do so until his death in 1793 and his era would see the central pavilion of the Marble Hall in the Corps de Logis was decorated with a fresco by Nicolas Guibal. Czar Paul I of Russia and his wife Sophie Dorothea of Württemberg, one of Charles Eugene's nieces, visited the castle in 1775.

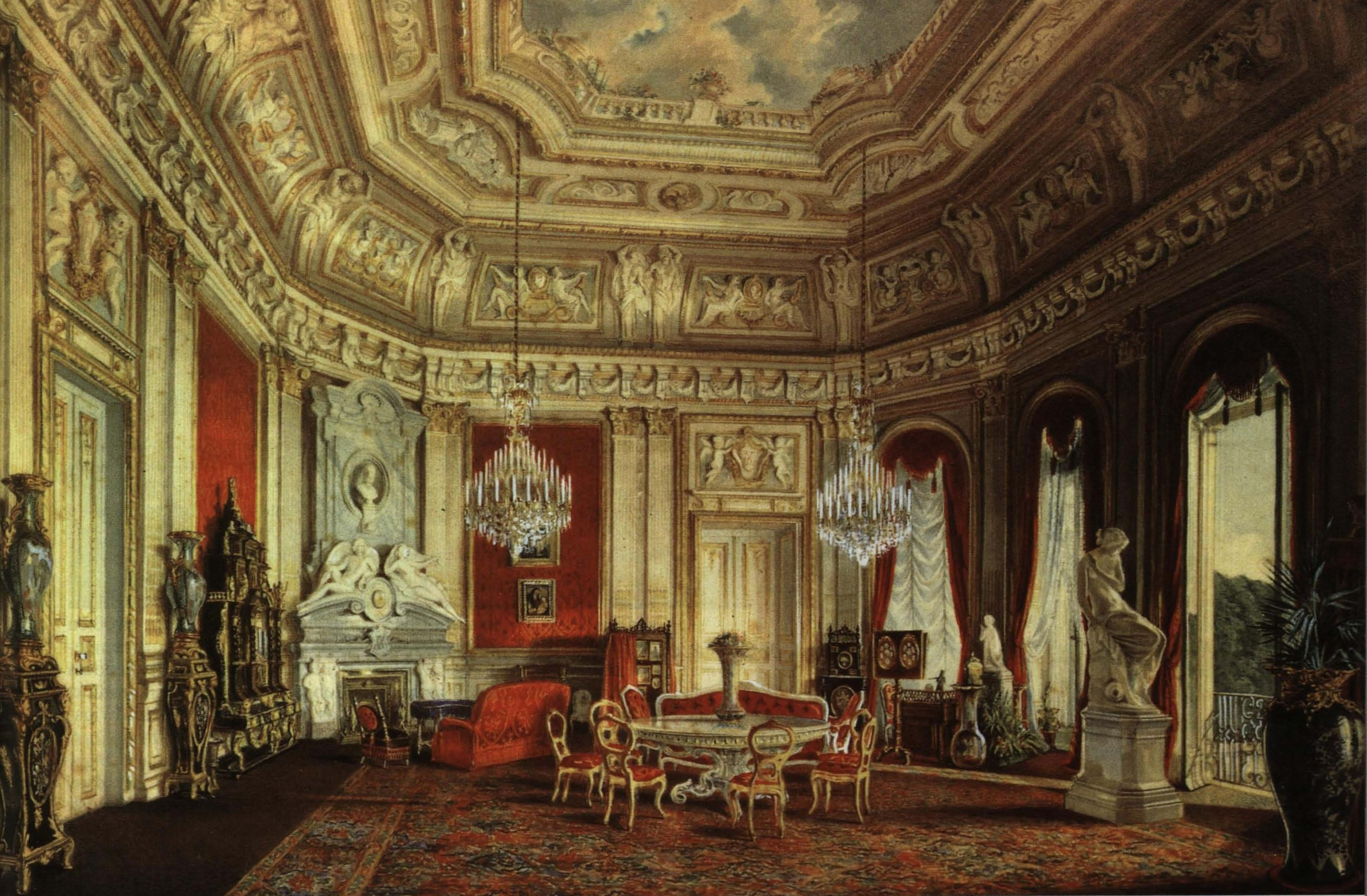
Salon rosé of Queen Olga (1866)

When Charles Eugene died in 1793, New Palace was given more much needed repairs. 1789 saw the completion of the City Wing and the Garden Wing in 1791 during the rule of Frederick II Eugene, Duke of Württemberg (construction elsewhere could continue into the 19th century). In 1806, as the palace was finally nearing completion, Napoleon Bonaparte visited the New Palace. Eleven years later, von Thouret redecorated some of the rooms of the Red Marble Hall during the visit of Czar Alexander I.

When Duke and then King Frederick I died, William I moved the seat of his power back to the New Palace and hired Giovanni Salucci and later his pupil Ferdinand Gabriel and charged them with renovating the palace's Grey and Yellow Marble Halls in 1836. In 1840 and 1841 and from 1852 to 1854, the court painter Josef Anton Gegenbauer painted three frescoes in the rooms created next to the staircase on the ground floor with scenes from the history of the Duchy and the Kingdom of Württemberg. Under Duke Charles I and his wife Olga only minor changes were made to the castle, mainly made in the royal living area and by Joseph von Egle were executed. William II renounced the residency of the dukes in the New Palace, and the palace was somewhat opened to the public for the first time.

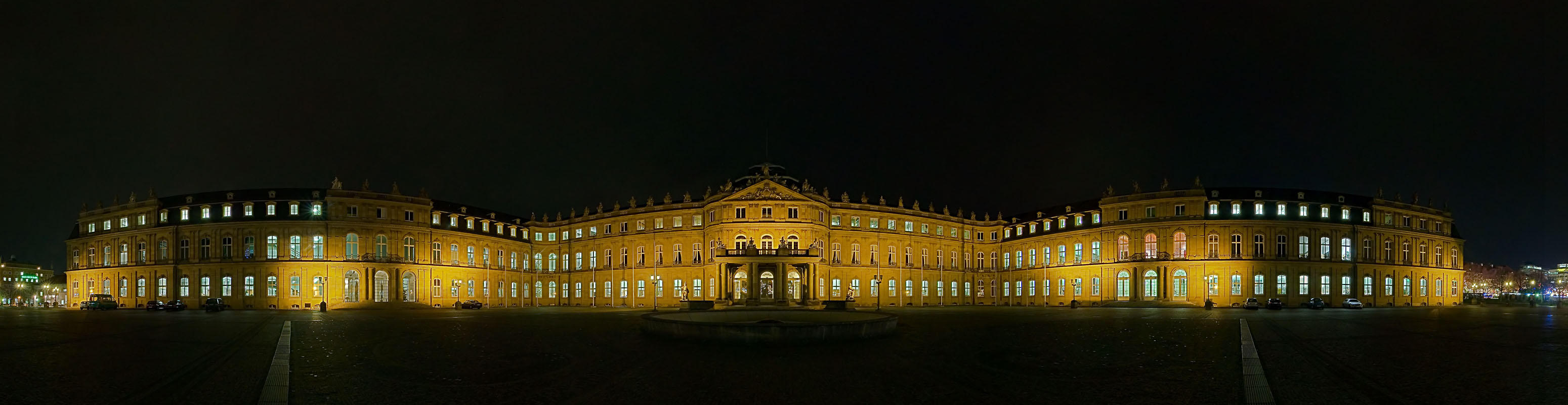
Panoramic frontal view

=== Use after 1918 ===
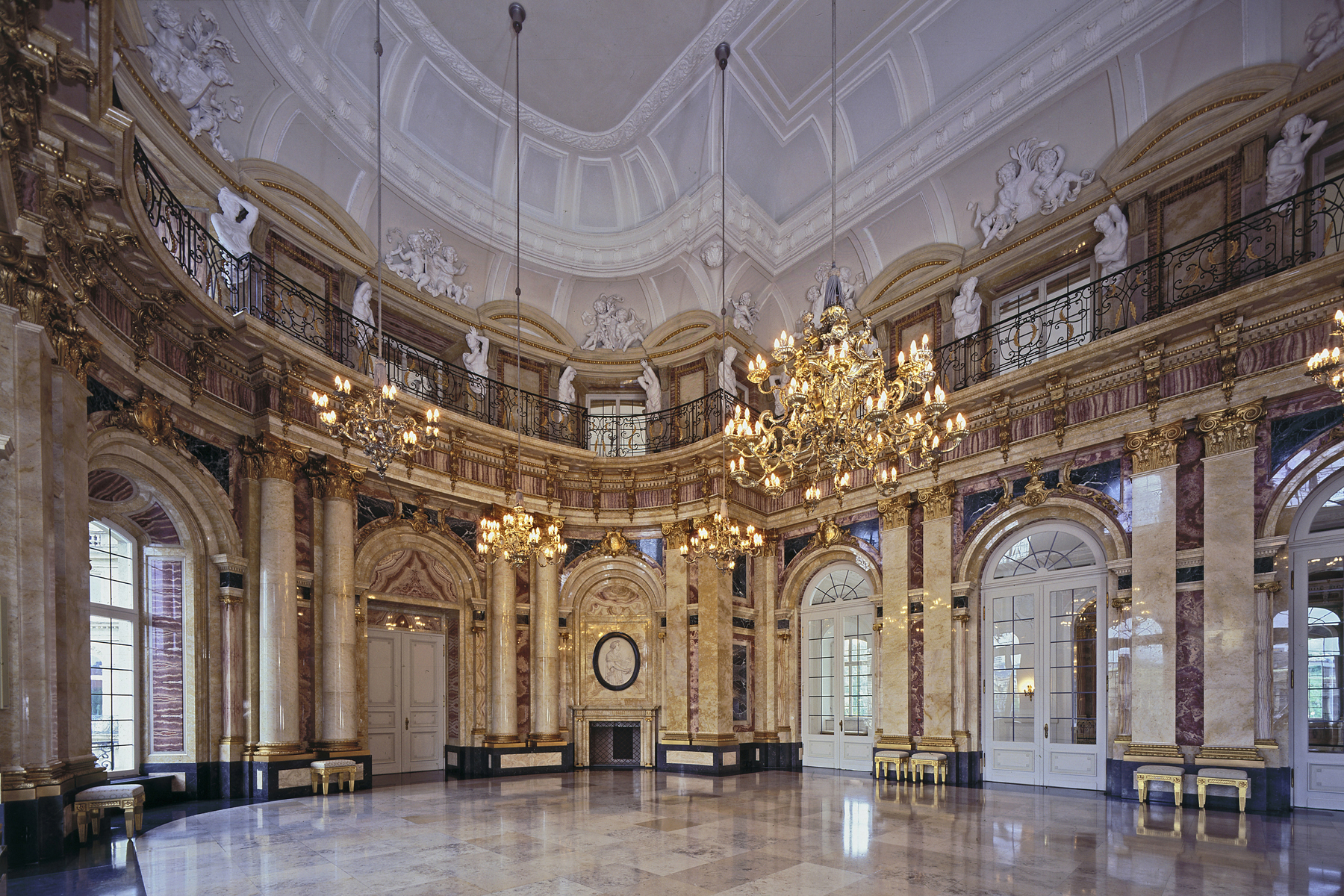
Marble Hall

After Wilhelm II of Württemberg abdicated his throne on November 30, 1918, the palace passed into state ownership. In 1919, the German Foreign Institute used the ground floor and some of the garden wing to house their offices and showrooms and some of the first and second floors became the headquarters for the local police. In the early 1920s, nearly the entire first floor became a museum displaying the royal Kunstkammer, majolica collection, and former living places of the kings of Württemberg. On 15 April 1920, Richard von Weizsäcker, future President of Germany, was born in the attic of the palace. When the German Foreign Institute moved out in 1928, the remaining unused portions of the palace were converted into German military and ancient antiquity museums. When the police headquarters moved out in 1926, the second floor housed the offices of the antiquities collection and historic preservation authorities.

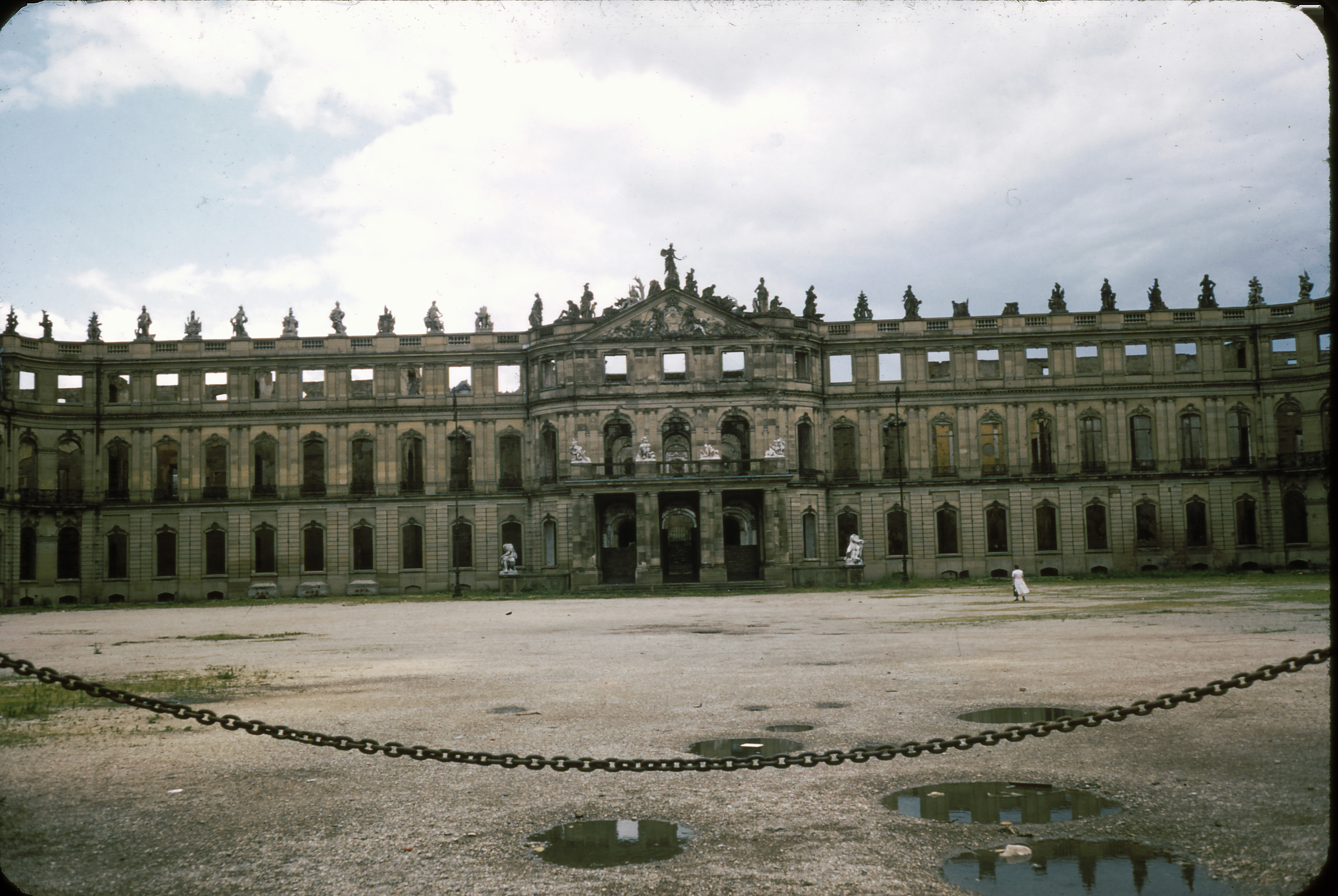
Heavily damaged Neues Schloss, in 1956 before restoration

In the World War II air raids on February 21, 1944, Neue Schloss was almost completely burned to the ground by Allied bombs, leaving only the facade standing. For many years, preservationists fought to rebuild Neue Schloss (once, it was nearly demolished in favor of a hotel) until 1957 when finally it was agreed in the Baden-Württemberg Landtag that the castle would be rebuilt – by one vote. Since the reconstruction that began in 1958 under the careful direction of Horst Linde, the castle has been used by the State's government, starting with the Corps de logis (Now used for representation by the State Ministry) and the two wings of the castle. The only part of the castle that was not fully restored was an air raid shelter under the building that was demolished in 1958. Today it is used by the State Ministries of Finance and Education and is now open to the public via regular guided tours. (Note: Until 2012, it was also the locastion of Baden-Württemberg's Ministry of Culture.)

== Gallery ==
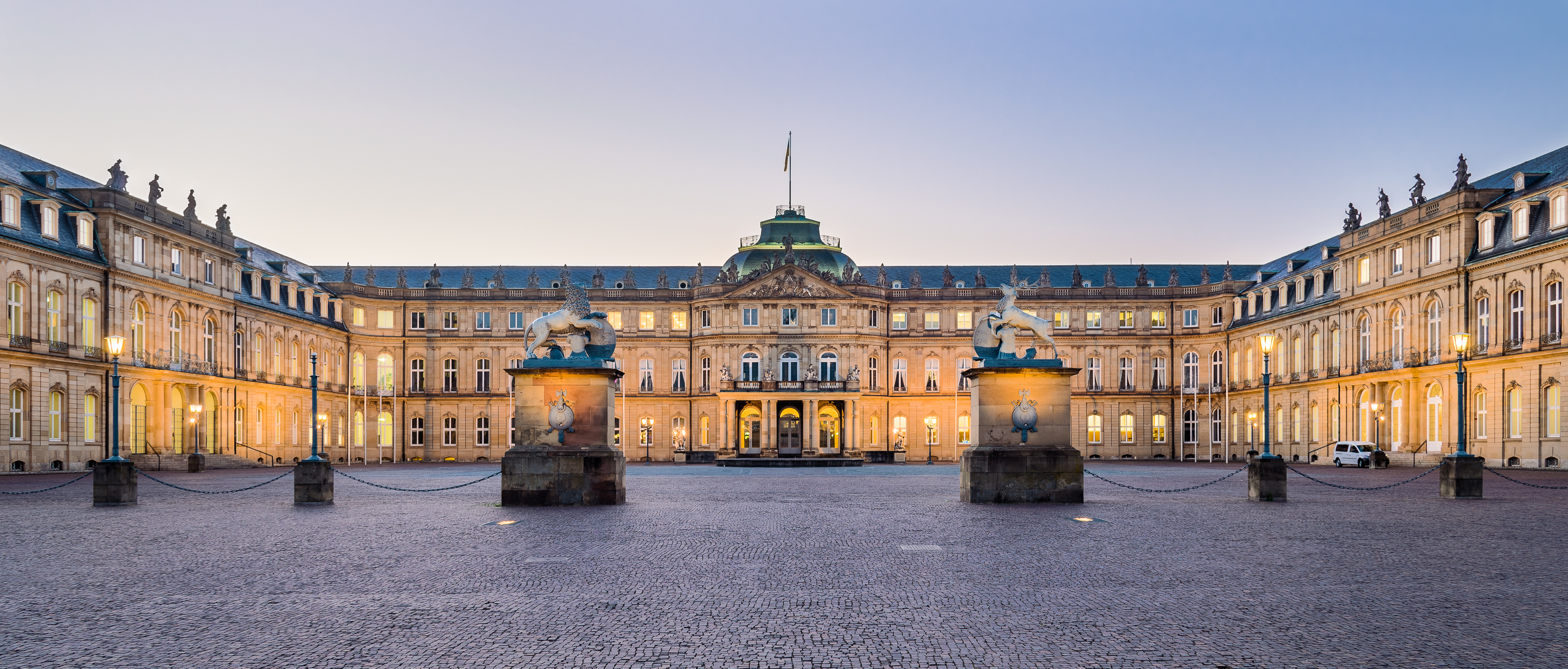

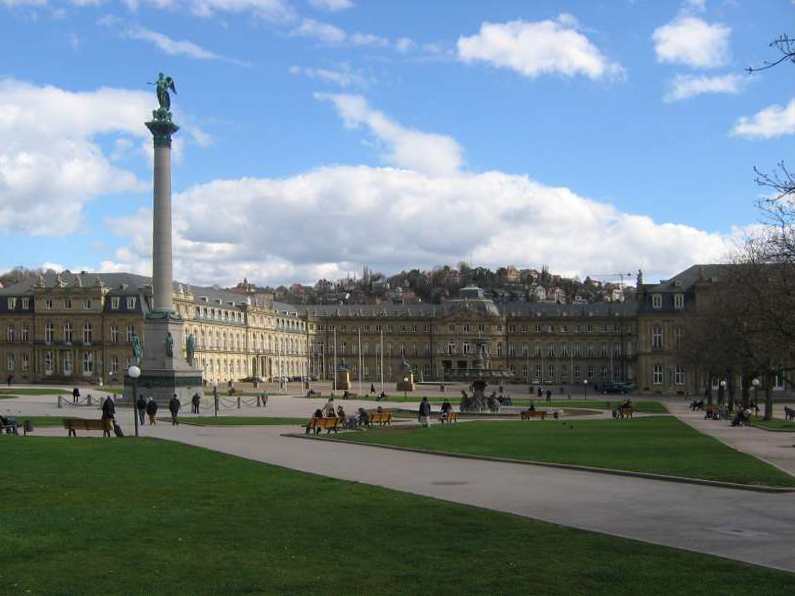
Schlossplatz with New Castle

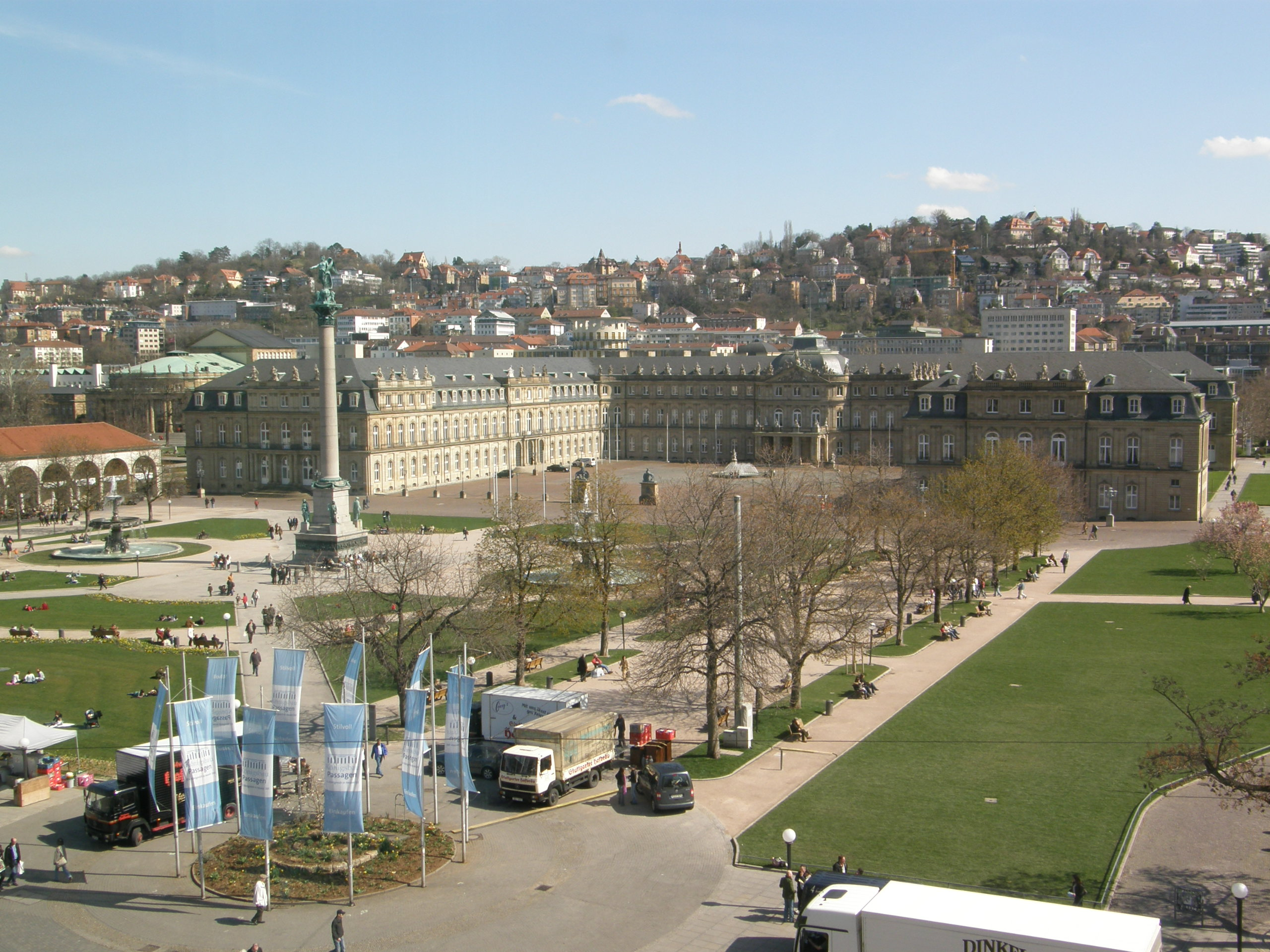
The New Castle viewed from the New Gallery

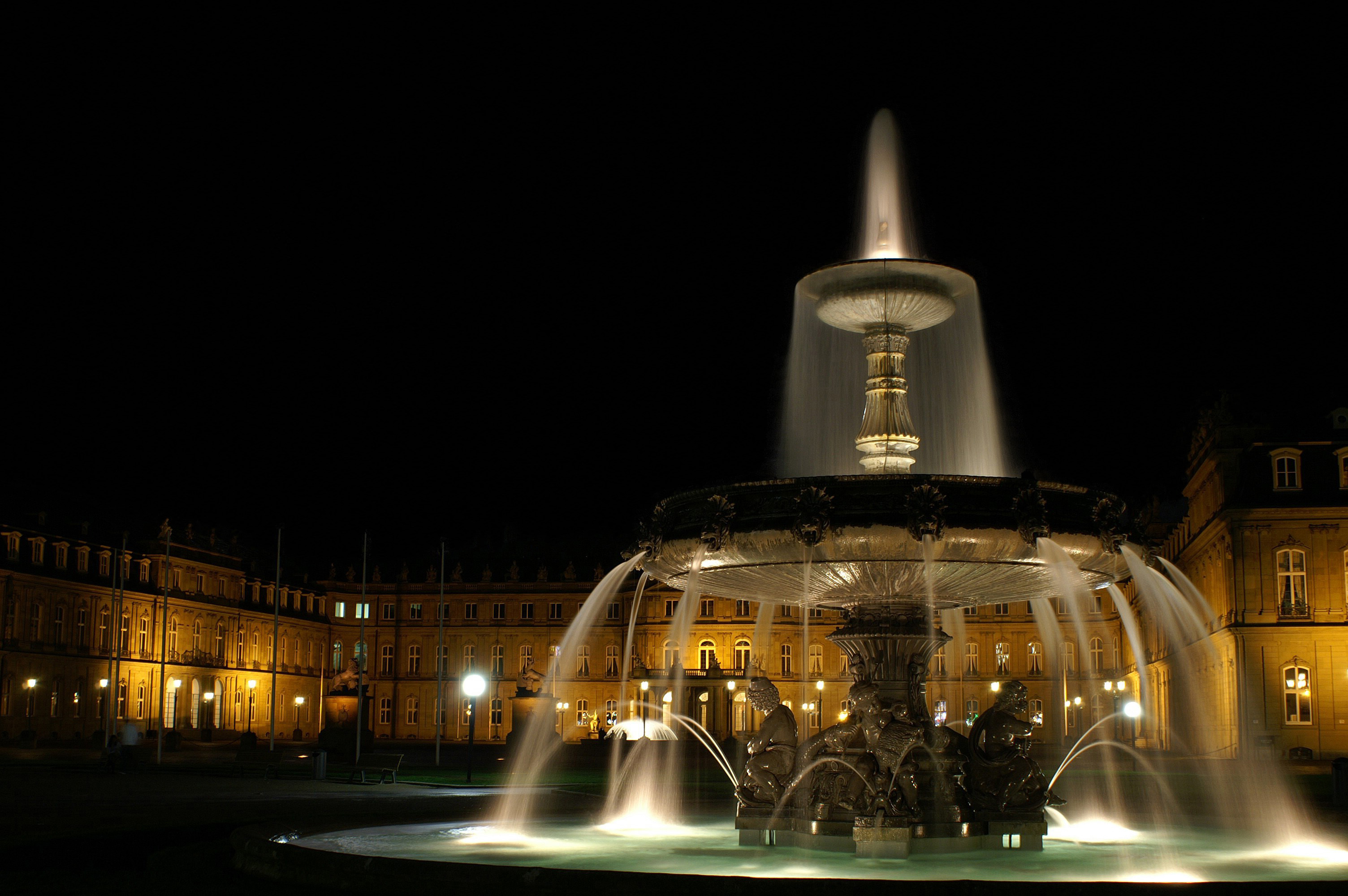
Fountains in front of the New Castle at night

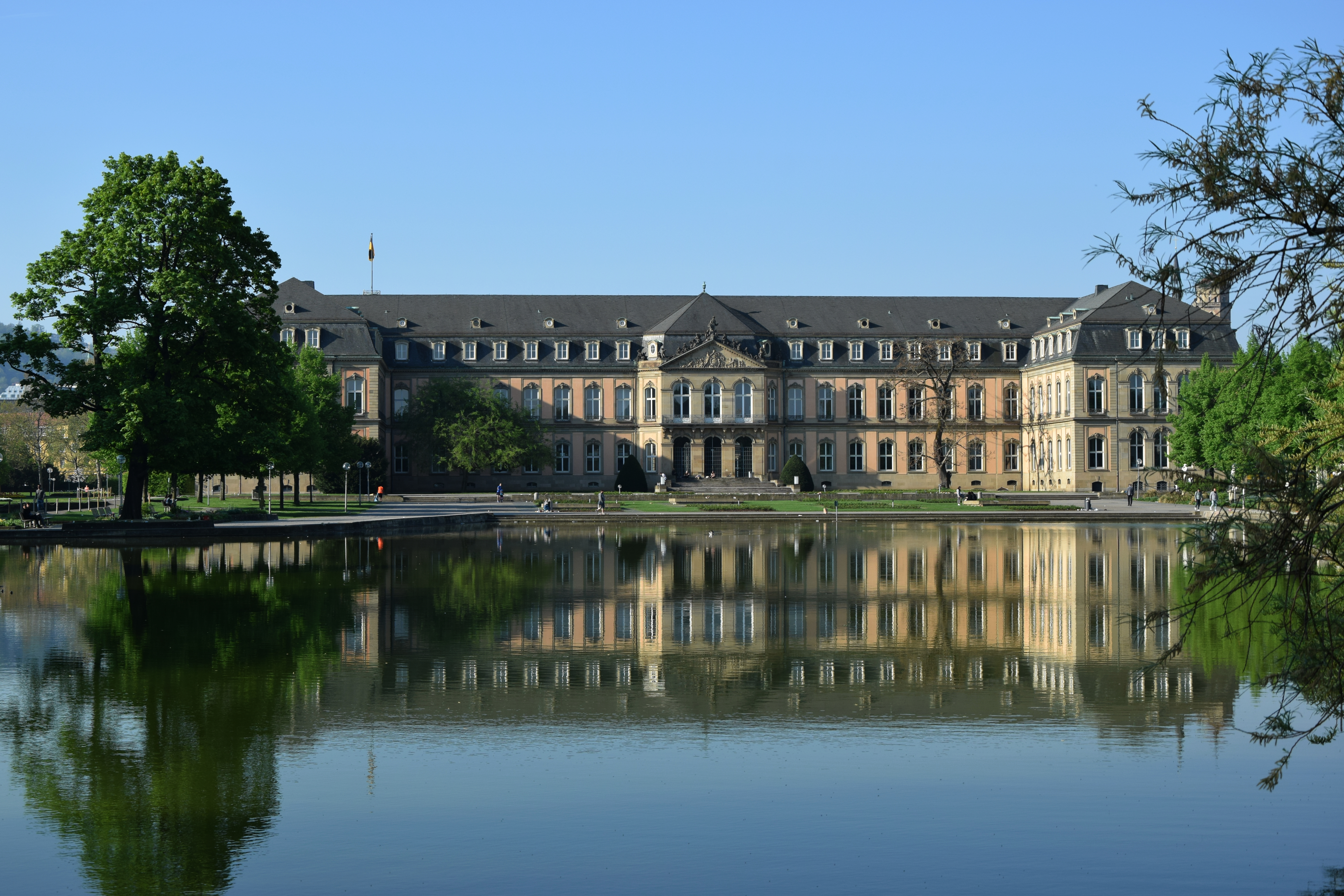
View from garden

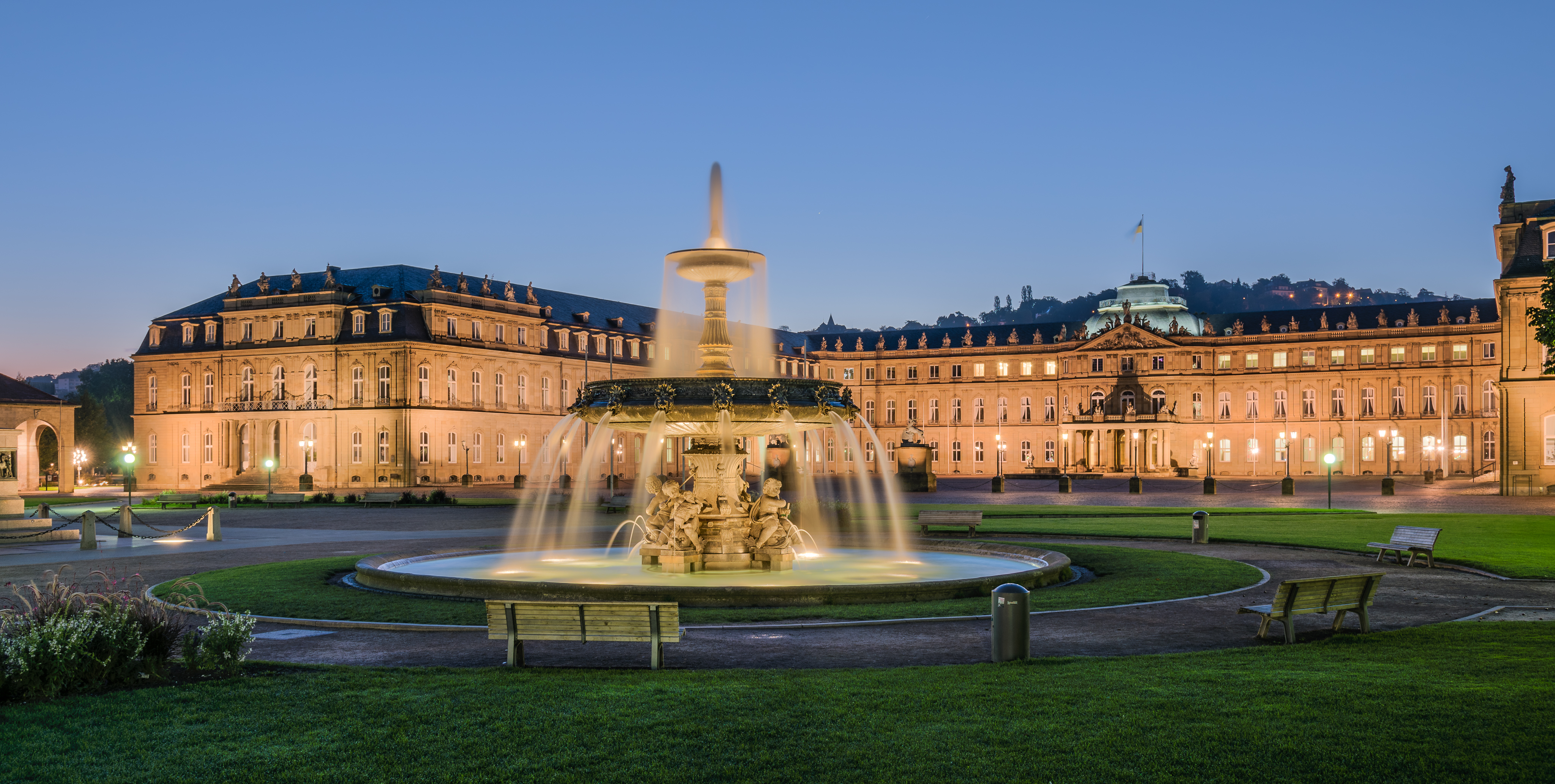
New Castle in 2015

== See also ==
- List of Baroque residences
- Ludwigsburg Palace
