= Reinhard Heinrich Ferdinand Fischer =

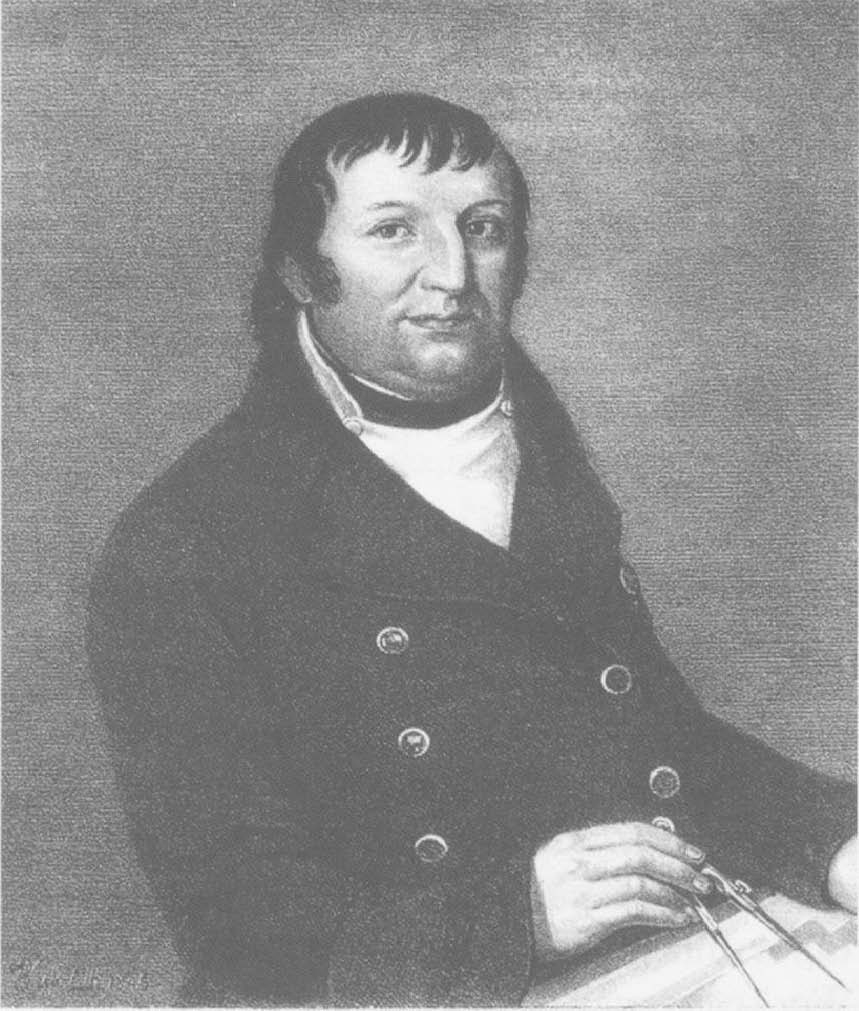
- Born: 18 June 1746; Stuttgart
- Died: 25 June 1813 (aged 67); Stuttgart
- Education: Philippe de La Guêpière
- Known for: architecture

Reinhard Heinrich Ferdinand Fischer (18 June 1746 in Stuttgart – 25 June 1813 in Stuttgart) was a German architect and master builder of Duke Charles Eugene of Württemberg.

== Life ==
Fischer, officially a son of the Duke's councillor and first master chef, but possibly an illegitimate son of the Duke had his education at the Gymnasium Illustre in Stuttgart and then completed an apprenticeship with the sculptor Johann Christoph Friedrich Beyer and from 1760 with the painter Nicolas Guibal. He was taught architecture by Philippe de La Guêpière. In 1771 he became a teacher at the Karlsschule Stuttgart. In 1773 he became court architect; in 1774 he received the rank of captain. In 1775, he became professor of Civil Architecture at the Military Academy of the Karlsschule. In 1797, he was promoted to major and chief architect. In 1802 he retired.

== Works ==
Fischer participated in the construction of the Cathedral of St. Eberhard in the Königstraße in Stuttgart, the New Palace (1807), the Hohenheim palace, for which he was planning a large equestrian center, the Castle Solitude, the pheasant garden in Weilimdorf and the first Bärenschlössle Castle (1768) in Stuttgart. He was also the architect of the early classical Franziska Church in Stuttgart-Birkach, that was presented to the population of Birkach by Charles Eugene in 1780. After Charles Eugene's death, Fischer designed the Schloss Kirchheim as a dower house for Franziska of Hohenheim. Among the buildings built by Fischer privately are the Vischer Palace and the Reichert House in Calw.
