= Leopoldo Retti =

18th-century Italian architect

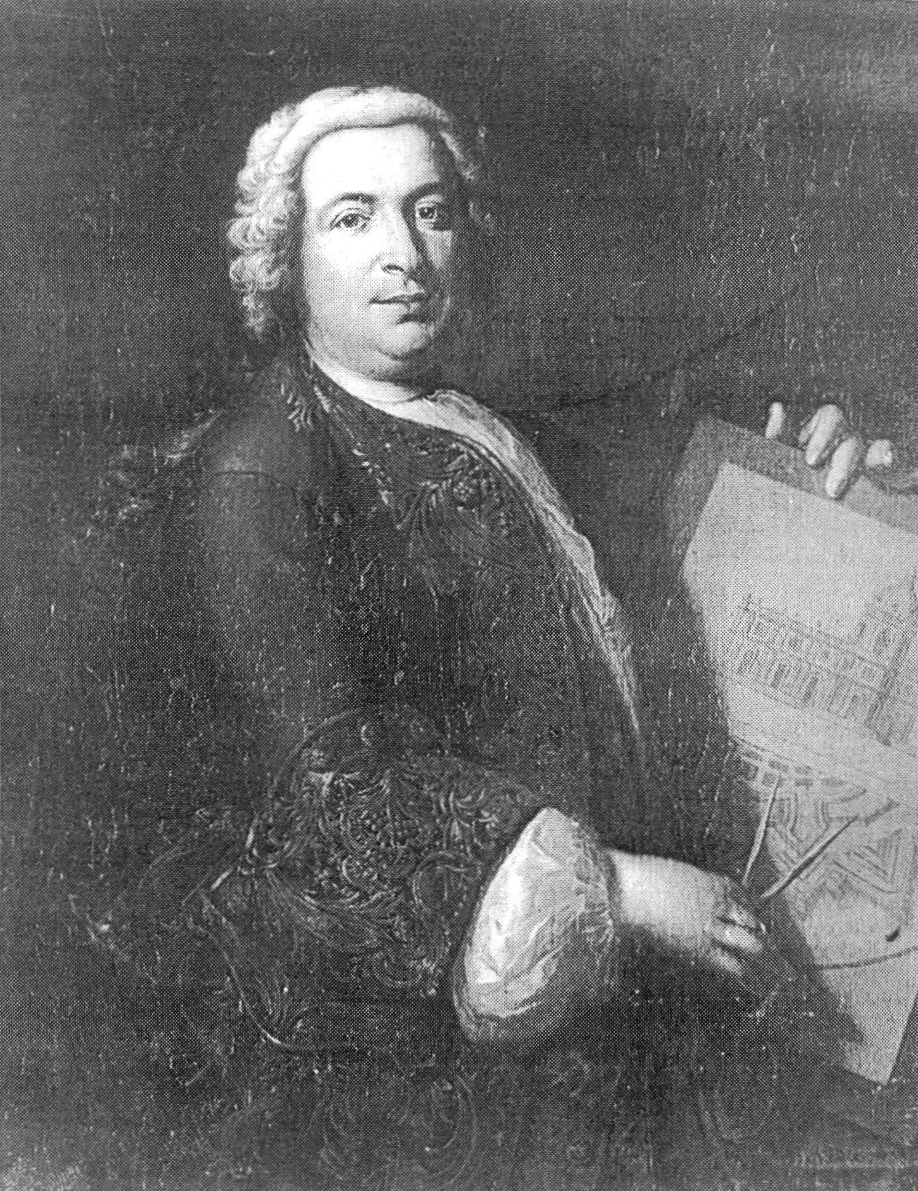
- Born: 1704; Laino
- Died: September 18, 1751 (aged 46 or 47)
- Occupation: Architect

Leopoldo Mattia Retti, also known as Leopold Retty (born 1704, Laino – d. September 18, 1751, Stuttgart) was an Italian architect working in Southern Germany. He is considered one of the leading representatives of late French Baroque. In Ansbach and in Mögeldorf there is a street named after Retti.

== Life and career ==
Leopoldo Retti was born in 1704 to a family of artists. His father, Lorenzo Mattia Retti, was a plasterer, as was Lorenzo's brother Donato Giuseppe Frisoni. Leopoldo's brothers were Donato Riccardo, Livio, and Paolo Retti. In 1714, Frisoni became the building director of Ludwigsburg Palace and three years later he brought the Retti brothers to Ludwigsburg to work on the palace. While his brothers worked at the palace, Leopoldo traveled to Paris and received an architectural education.

In 1726, Eberhard Louis, Duke of Württemberg, charged Retti with the continued construction of Ludwigsburg and has given the honorary rank Leutnant and an annual salary of 400 guilders. Five years later in 1731, Retti was called to Ansbach and made a Hauptmann. The next year, Carl Friedrich von Zocha resigned and Retti replaced him as court architect of the Principality of Ansbach. In 1741, Retti was named a Major of the Artillery.

== Works ==
- Ansbach Residence
- Retti Palace
- Ansbach Synagogue
- Dennenlohe Manor
- Eschenau Palace
- Eschenau Palace
- Kirchberg Palace (Kirchberg an der Jagst)
- Ludwigsburg Palace
- Unterschwaningen Palace
- New Palace (Stuttgart)
