= Nicolas Guibal =

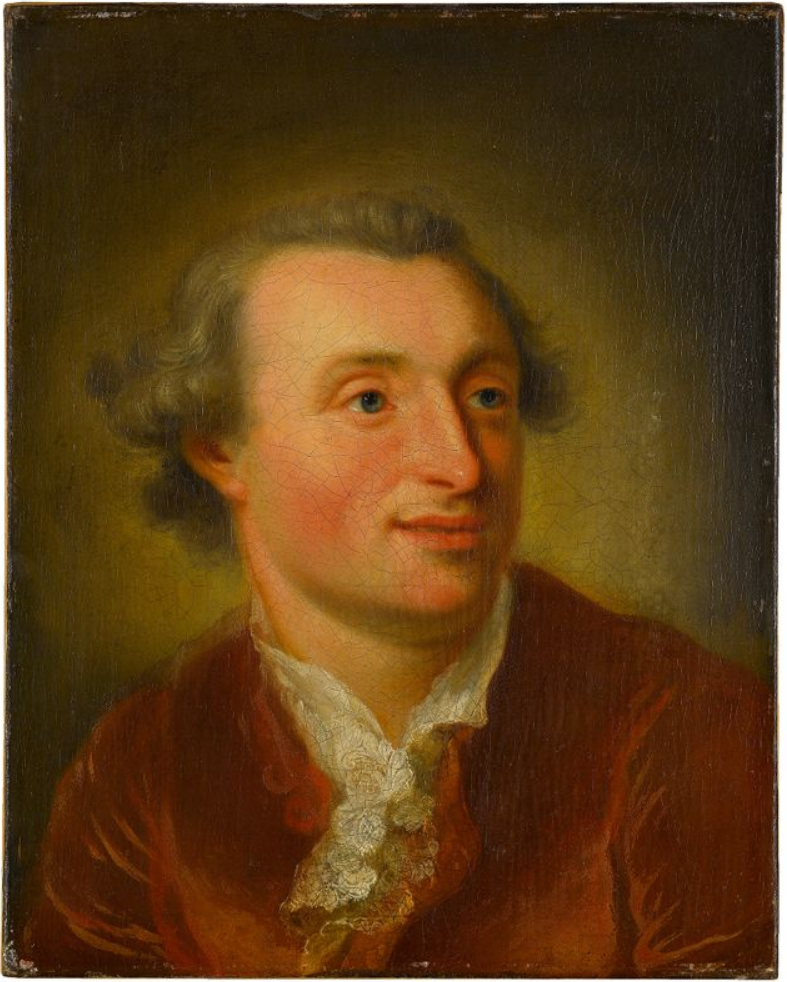
Self-portrait (c.1760)

Nicolas Guibal (29 November 1725, Lunéville — 3 November 1784, Stuttgart) was an artist, art educator and art gallery director from the Duchy of Lorraine. He worked for most of his career as a court painter for Charles Eugene, Duke of Württemberg. His main works consist of ceiling paintings in the Solitude Palace, Monrepos, and the Hohe Karlsschule.

== Life ==
Nicolas Guibal was the son of Lorraine sculptor Barthélemy Guibal. His father first worked for Duke Leopold, Duke of Lorraine in Lunéville and, from 1733, for Stanislas Leszczyński in Nancy and the surrounding area. His mother, Marie-Catherine Barthélemy, came from a wealthy local family.

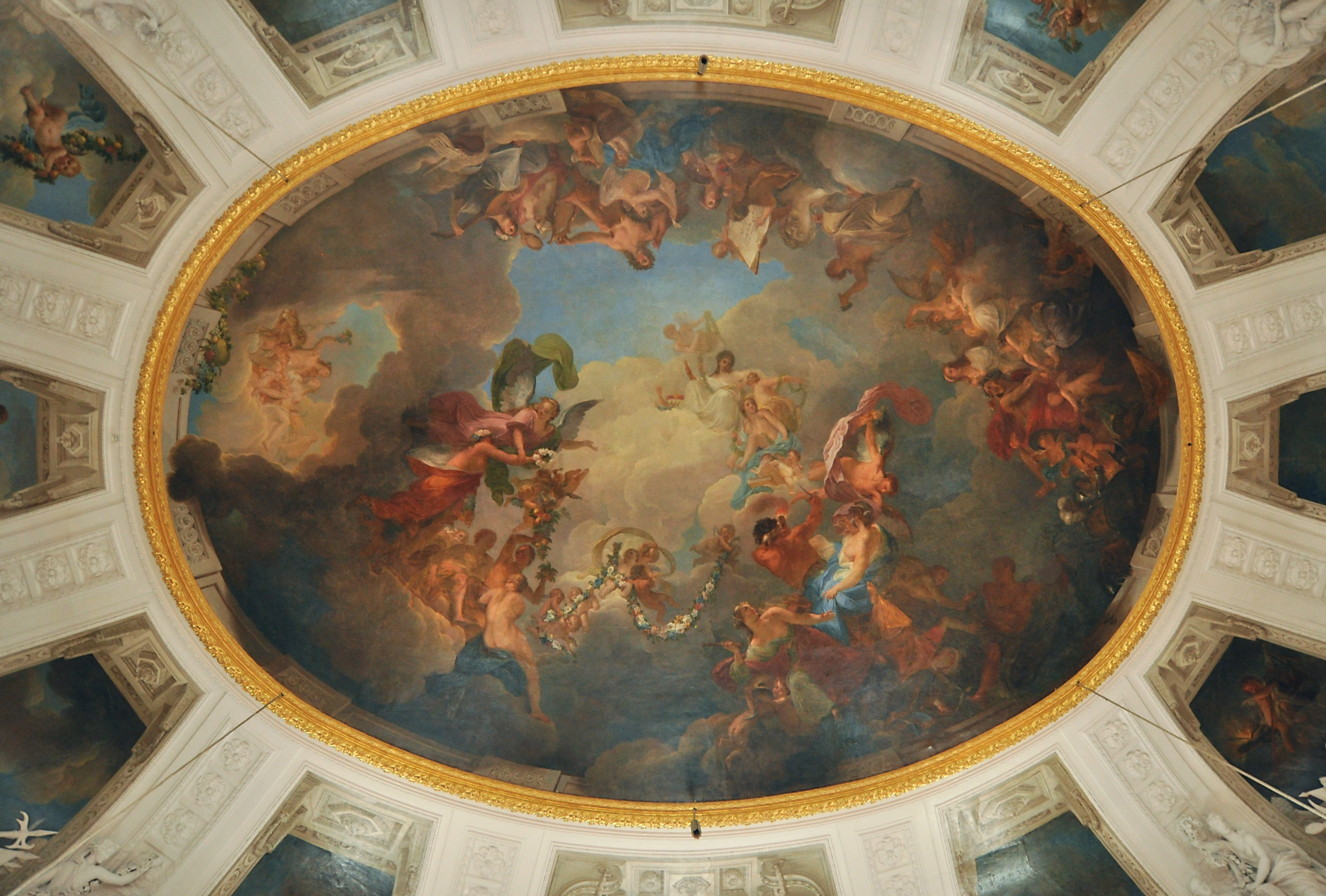
Allegory of the state's prosperity thanks to the virtues of Duke Charles Eugene, main room of Solitude Palace, 1766

He received his initial art training in his father's sculpture workshop. Preferring to train as a painter, he went to Nancy to study with Claude Charles, the former court painter to Duke Leopold of Lorraine. In 1740, he moved to Paris where he enrolled at the Académie des Beaux-Arts studying under Charles-Joseph Natoire. In 1749 he was involved in painting the opera house in the Lusthaus in Stuttgart, where he attracted the attention of Charles Eugene, Duke of Württemberg, who was planning the decoration for his residence. Guibal won the favor of the Duke, who sent him to Rome between 1752 and 1754 to continue his training. There he worked with Anton Raphael Mengs. Mengs' interest in Renaissance painters such as Raphael and Antiquity and the eclecticism of his works had a lasting influence on Guibal's work.

After his return to Stuttgart he was appointed court painter and took part in all the important decorative projects of the Duke, such as those for the palaces of Ludwigsburg and Stuttgart. Guibal married Christine Regina Juliana Greber in 1759. The marriage produced five children. From 1774 he taught at the Hohe Karlsschule, where he was appointed professor in 1776.

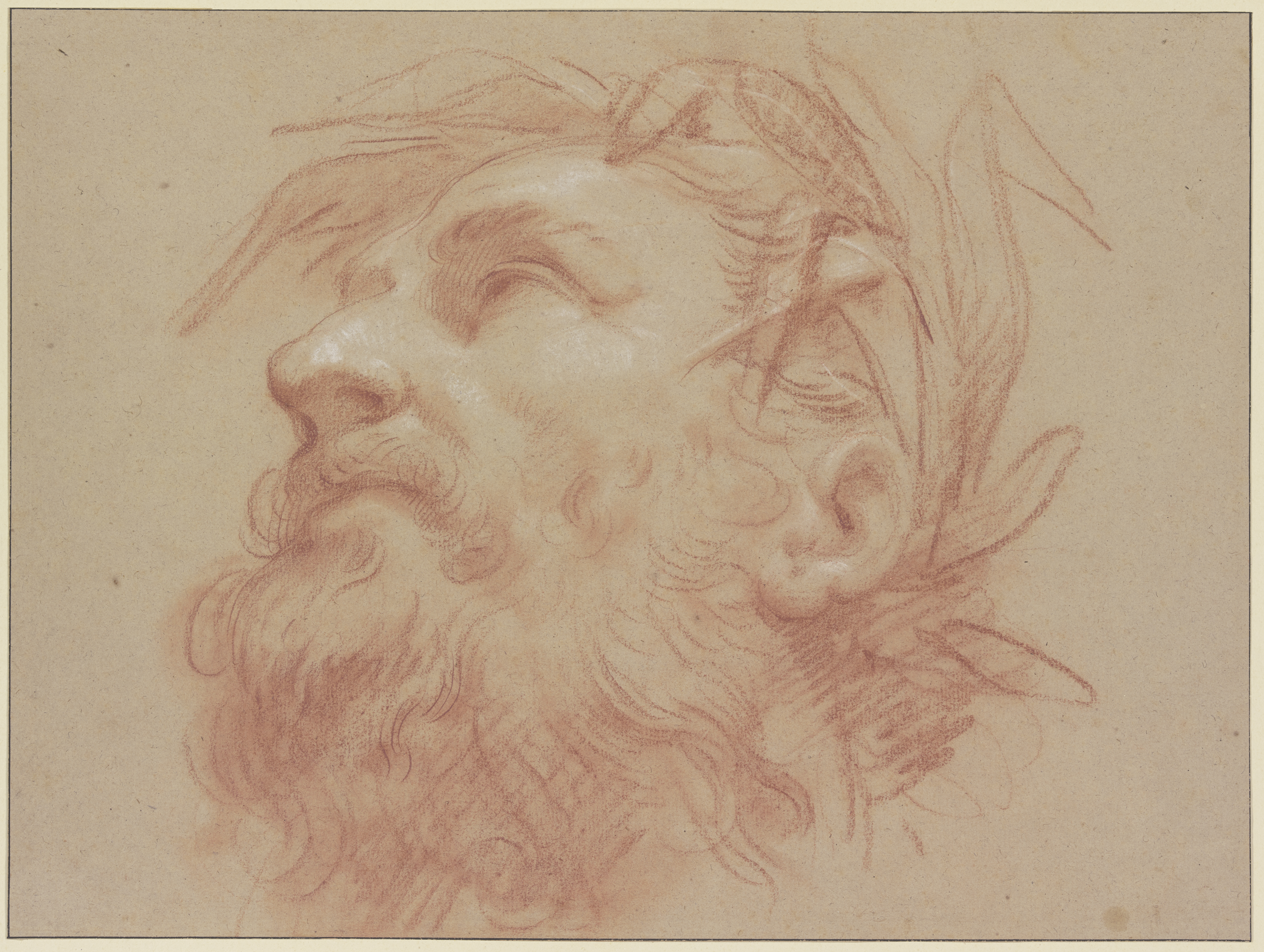
Head of a river god

Since the late 1770s, his health had been deteriorating. In 1781, he had to go to Strasbourg for a cure due to recurring severe convulsive attacks. The doctors diagnosed intoxication by paints containing heavy metals. Nicolas Guibal died on 3 November 1784.

Among his pupils were Johann Gotthard von Müller, Johann Heinrich von Dannecker, Reinhard Heinrich Ferdinand Fischer, Heinrich Friedrich Füger, Philipp Friedrich von Hetsch, Joseph Nicolaus Peroux, Ludovike Simanowiz, Nikolaus Friedrich von Thouret, among others. As a teacher, he provided an entire generation of artists not only with solid technical skills, but also with a universal education. A theorist of early Classicism, which he had premiered in Württemberg in its French expression, he conveyed to his pupils the ideals of a new view of art based on Antiquity.

== Work ==
His main works include ceiling paintings for the Solitude Palace and the Hohe Karlsschule (Stuttgart Military Academy) in Germany. With his formal language and allegorical pictorial statements, Guibal's art can be situated in the late Baroque and early Classicism. His work was influenced by that of Anton Raphael Mengs which is evident in his portraits and detail studies. In his designs for large-scale ceiling paintings his French training is reflected.

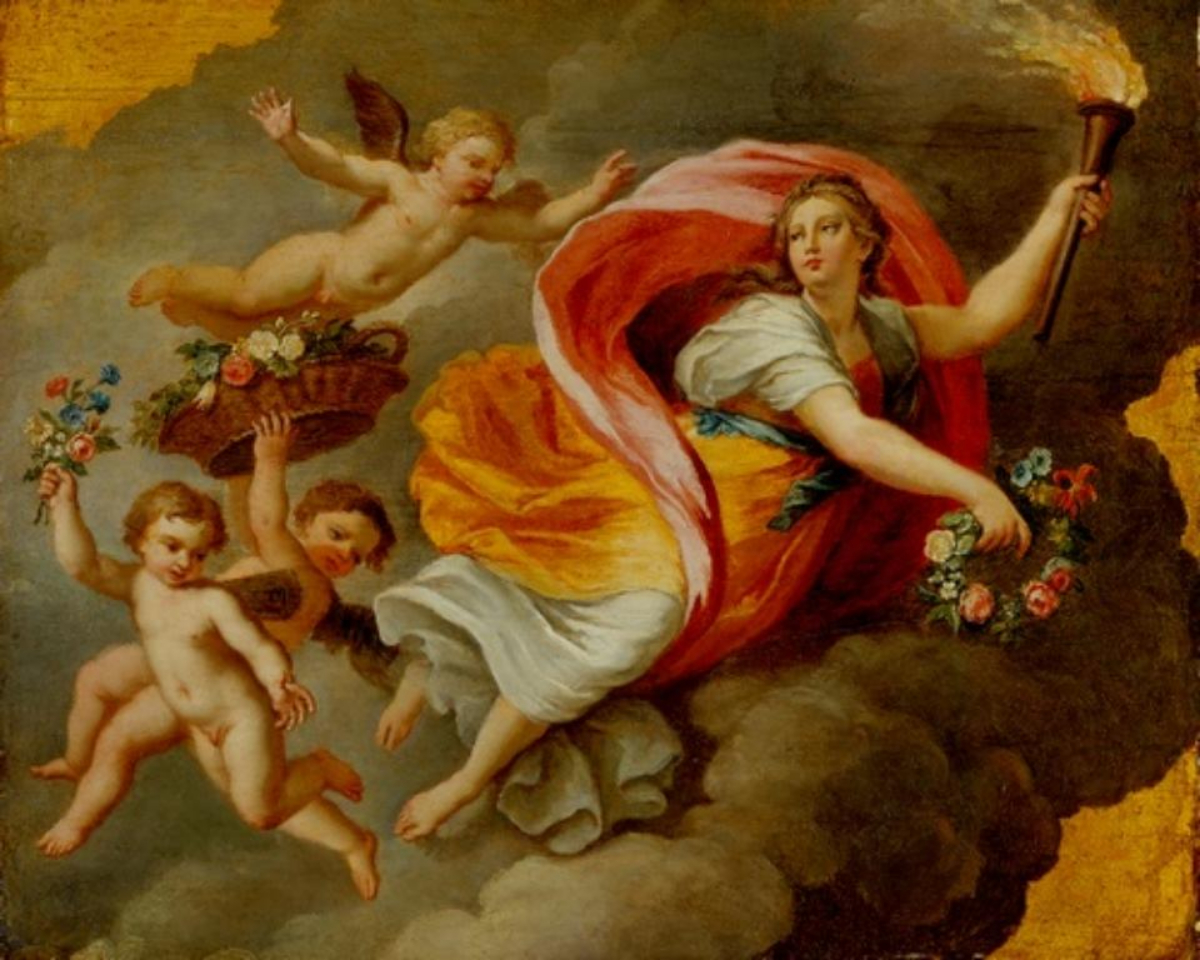
Aurora

Highly regarded by his contemporaries, his art was rejected barely twenty years after his death as outdated and eclectic. Shortly after 1800, court architect Nikolaus Friedrich von Thouret had decorations by Guibal and Philippe de La Guêpière in Monrepos Palace destroyed and replaced with Empire style decorations. His posthumous critics included Johann Wolfgang von Goethe, who accused him of lacking seriousness and a lack of understanding of the “well-understood drawing of beautifully balanced forms”.

During World War II most of his monumental paintings as well as many panel paintings and drawings were destroyed.
