= Karlsschule Stuttgart =

Coordinates: 48°46′40″N 9°11′00″E

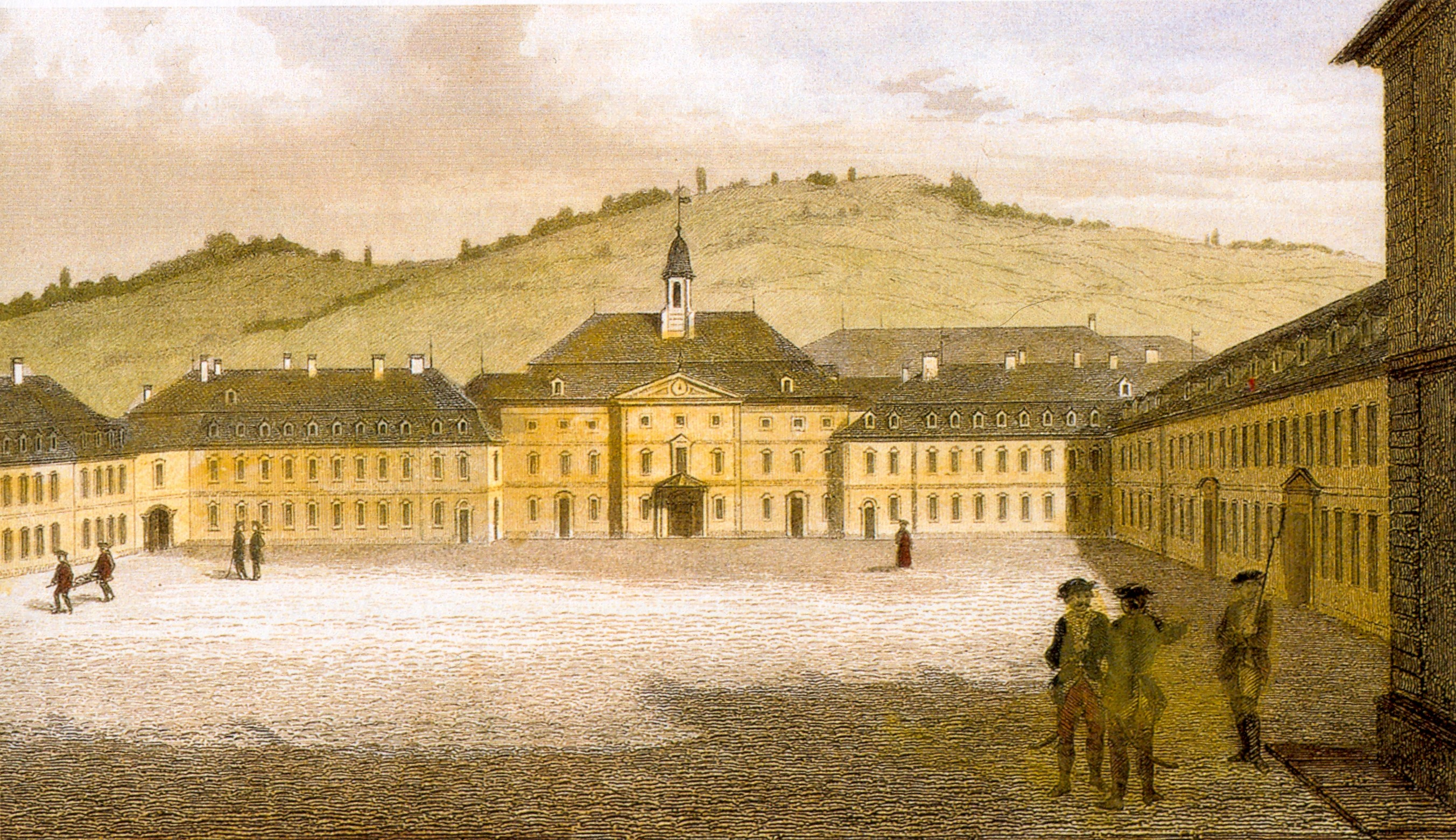
The Karlsschule; engraving after a drawing by Karl Philipp Conz

Hohe Karlsschule ("Karl's High School") was the strict military academy founded by Karl Eugen, Duke of Württemberg in Stuttgart, Germany. It was first founded in 1770 as a military orphanage, but then converted into a military academy in 1773 for the duke.

Politically the duke was quite unimportant and with this school he wanted to enhance his prestige. In 1770, it was moved to Castle Solitude, and in 1775 into the city. Raised in 1781 by Emperor Joseph II to university status under the name Karls Hohe Schule, it was disbanded after the death of Duke Carl Eugen by his brother Ludwig Eugen, Duke of Württemberg in 1794. The building, situated behind Neues Schloss, was destroyed in World War II.

== Alumni ==
Friedrich Schiller was one of its alumni. He spent eight years of his life in this academy and suffered a lot in his first years of his stay. At first he was considered an average student, but in his second year, he often became ill and his performance suffered. When he joined the school's medical faculty, his life took a turn for the better and Schiller began with poetry.

Others include:

- Ludwig Abeille
- Johann Heinrich Ferdinand Autenrieth
- Karl Wilhelm Marschall von Bieberstein
- Ernst Franz Ludwig Marschall von Bieberstein
- Friedrich August Marschall von Bieberstein
- Antonio Boroni
- Georges Cuvier
- Johann Heinrich Dannecker (later professor there)
- Carl Degenkolb
- Adolph Carl August von Eschenmayer
- Friedrich Carl Fulda
- Johann Christoph Friedrich Haug
- Friedrich Fürst von Hohenzollern-Hechingen
- Johann Georg Kerner
- Carl Friedrich Kielmeyer
- Joseph Anton Koch
- Johann Friedrich LeBret
- Ferdinando Mazzanti
- Adam Albert von Neipperg
- Johann Friedrich Pfaff
- Johann Gottlieb Sämann
- Philipp Jakob Scheffauer
- Gottlieb Schick
- Ludwig Schubart
- Nikolaus Friedrich von Thouret
- Christian Zais
- Johann Rudolf Zumsteeg
