= Luca Antonio Colomba =

Swiss painter (1674–1737)

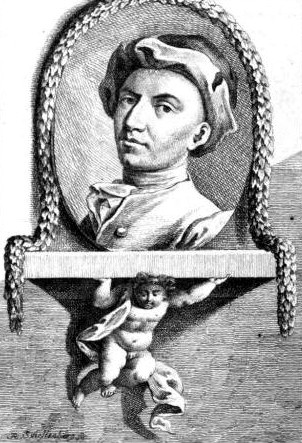
- Born: 1674; Arogno, Switzerland
- Died: 1737 (aged 62–63); Arogno, Switzerland

Luca Antonio Colomba (1674–1737) was a Swiss Baroque painter born at Arogno. His style was distinguished for its happy compositions and its careful design, as also for the delicate and tender colours. He painted in oil and fresco.

He was the son of Giovanni Battista Colomba of Arogno in the Swiss-Italian region of Ticino. He first trained with his father, as well as influenced by painters of his circle, as Carlo Antonio Bussi, Santino Bussi, and Carpoforo Tencalla.

In 1697, he married Martha Tosetti of Lugano; a year later the couple had a son and daughter. He was widowed and married in 1712 a second wife, Anna Maria, daughter of the painter Giovanni Carloni, and sister of Carlo Innocenzo Carloni and Diego Carloni. Colomba's brother also married Anna Maria's sister. For some years, he works in the court of Eberhard Louis, Duke of Württemberg. There he works alongside Donato Giuseppe Frisoni, architect of castle Ludwigsburg and general superintendent of the Building for the Duchy.

For five years he works at painting the ceiling decorations for the court chapel of Ludwigsburg with Carlo Innocenzo Carloni, Diego Francesco Carloni, and the stucco artist Donato Riccardo Retti. His nephew was the painter and scenic designer Giovanni Battista Innocenzo Colombo.

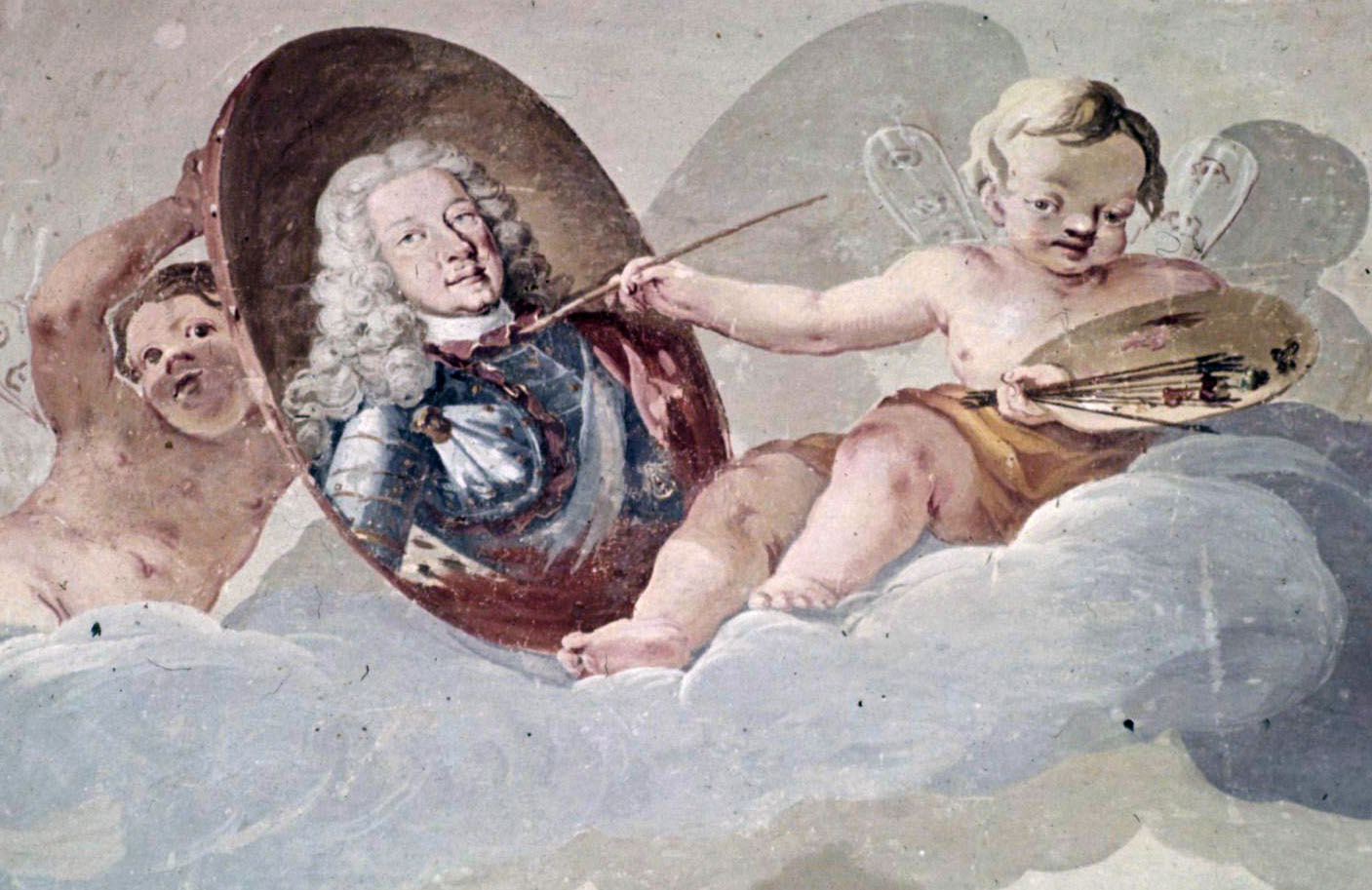
Allegorical portrait of Eberhard Louis, Duke of Württemberg painted by cherubs: mural painting from 1711 in the Ludwigsburg Palace.

== Sources ==
- Boni, Filippo de' (1852). Biografia degli artisti ovvero dizionario della vita e delle opere dei pittori, degli scultori, degli intagliatori, dei tipografi e dei musici di ogni nazione che fiorirono da'tempi più remoti sino á nostri giorni (2nd ed.). Venice; Googlebooks: Presso Andrea Santini e Figlio. pp. 236.
- "Colomba". SIKART Lexicon on art in Switzerland.
