= Diego Francesco Carlone =

Italian sculptor

- Born: 1674; Scaria
- Died: June 1750 (aged 75–76)
- Occupation: sculptor

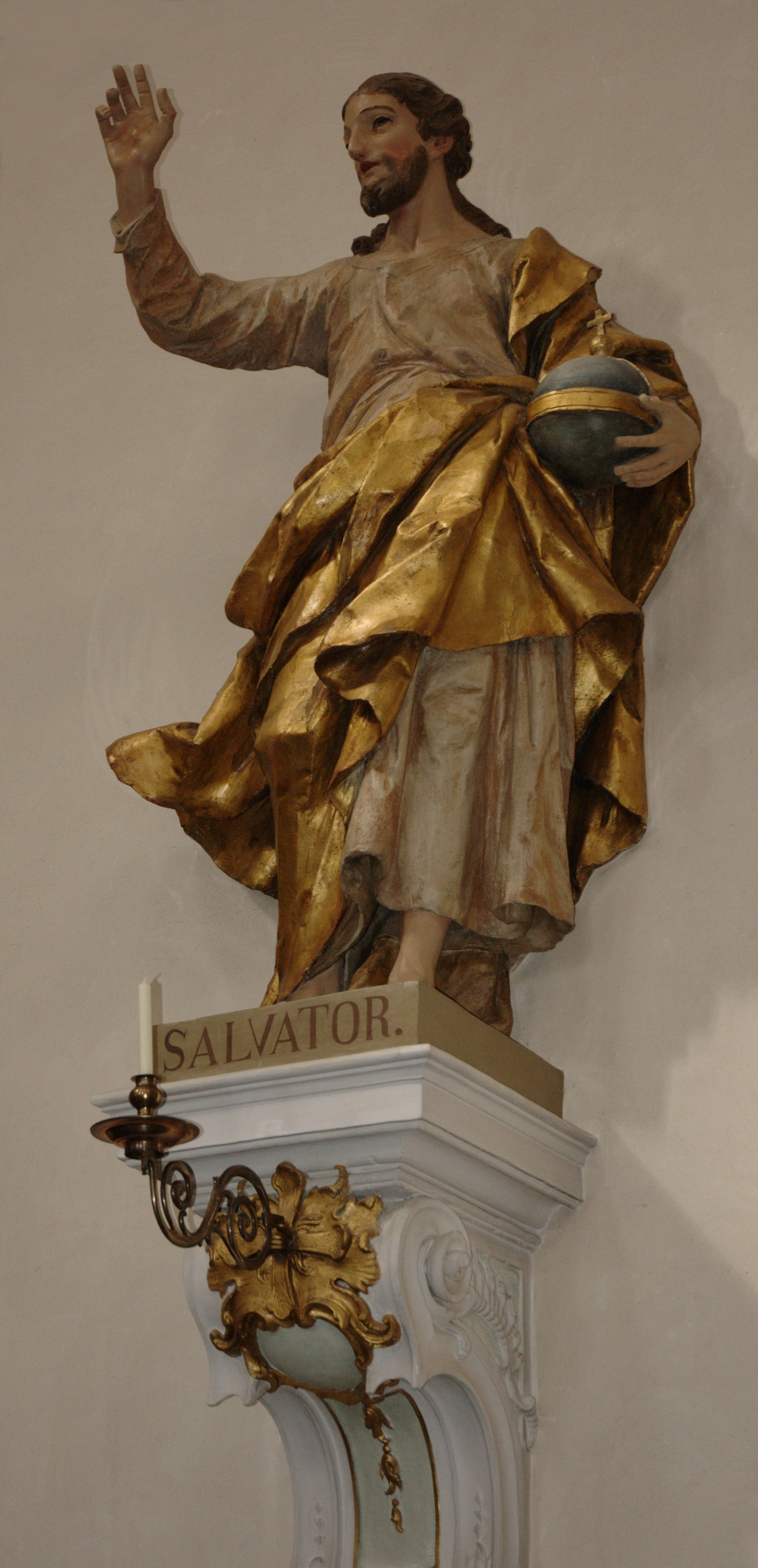
"Savior of the World", St. Vitus Basilica, Ellwangen.

Diego Francesco Carlone (1674 – 25 June 1750) was an Italian sculptor.

== Life ==
Carlone was born in Scaria into a family of artists. His grandfather, Pietro Francesco Corlone, was an architect of important monasteries in Styria, Carinthia and Upper Austria.

Diego's initial education was provided by the village priest. At the age of twelve, he apprenticed with his father, Giovanni Battista Carlone. Giovanni Battista, owned a workshop where Diego learned the sculpting trade. At the age of seventeen, he assisted his father on the stucco decorations for St. Stephen's Cathedral, Passau. In 1694, he went to Rome for further study.

Upon his return, he assisted his father with the decorations of the Maria Hilf Church in Amberg. While Giovanni Battista did the stucco work and main altar, Diego crafted the statues. After that he helped direct his father's workshop.

He was a sculptor and plasterer, working in Austria, southern Germany, Switzerland and northern Italy. He did not use marble as the material for his mostly larger-than-life figures, but rather the easier-to-model stucco. He spent his life as a traveling artist with different residences until he returned to his homeland at the age of over 60.

In 1704, architect Johann Bernhard Fischer von Erlach hired Carlone and Allio to work on some commissions he had in Salzburg, including the Kollegienkirche and the Johannesspitalskirche. In 1709, his uncle, architect Carlo Antonio Carlone, was tasked with adding a wing to Lambach Abbey. Diego provided statues of King David and Solomon for the ambulatory. In 1710, he produced bas-reliefs and statues for the Augustinian convent of S. Florian in Linz.

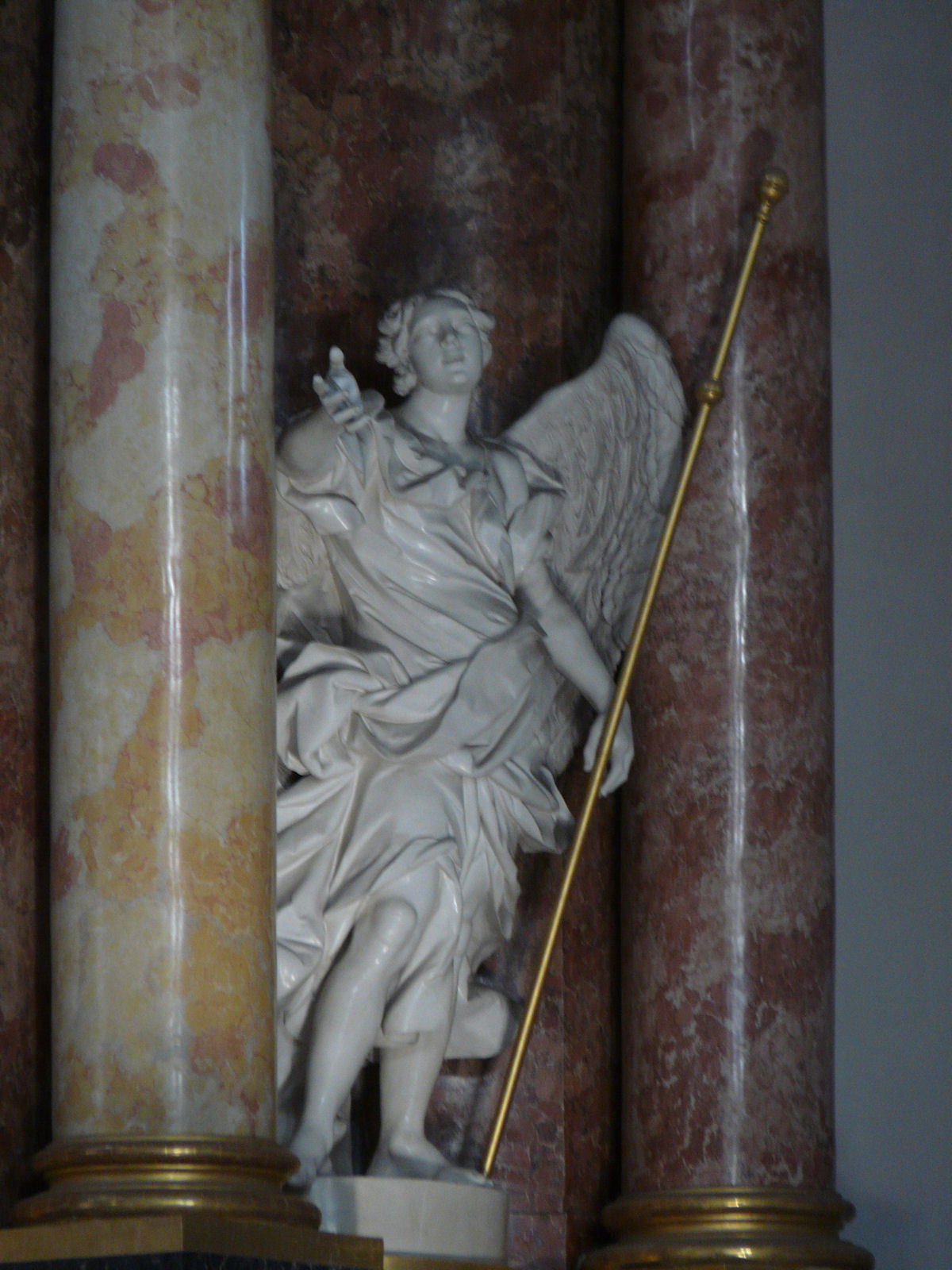
St Michael's, Passau

In 1712, he was back in Passau, where he made large statues of angels for the high altar in the Jesuit Church of St. Michael's, a church designed by his grandfather. Diego Carlone was in Augsburg in 1715, where Joseph Anton Feuchtmayer was one of his students. From Carlone, he learned the production techniques for creating the stucco figures with highly polished surfaces that would make Feuchtmayer famous. Feuchtmayer later worked with Diego at Weingarten Abbey. Around that same time, Diego executed the stuccos of sixteen rooms in the palace of Princess Wilhelmine von Grävenitz in Stuttgart.

Around 1718 he executed for the hunting lodge of Count von Rabatta in Thyrnau near Passau a life-size figure of Diana (now in the Bayerisches National Museum in Munich). In 1719, Diego assisted his uncle with the baroque ornamentation of Kremsmünster Abbey. Johann Friedrich Nette then hired Diego and his brother, Carlo Innocenzo, a fresco painter, to work on the Ludwigsburg Palace. Donato Giuseppe Frisoni, who was working on the Old Main Building at Ludwigsburg, brought Diego to Weingarten Abbey to design the main altar of St. Martin's Church.

His last commission was undertaken in 1738, providing several altars at the Einsiedeln Abbey church. He returned to Scaria and continued to do occasional work in the area. He did the stuccoes in the chapel of the Sacred Heart in the Basilica of San Fedele, Como. Diego Carlone died in Scaria on June 21, 1750 at the age of 76.
