= Giacomo Antonio Corbellini =

Baroque Italian artisan

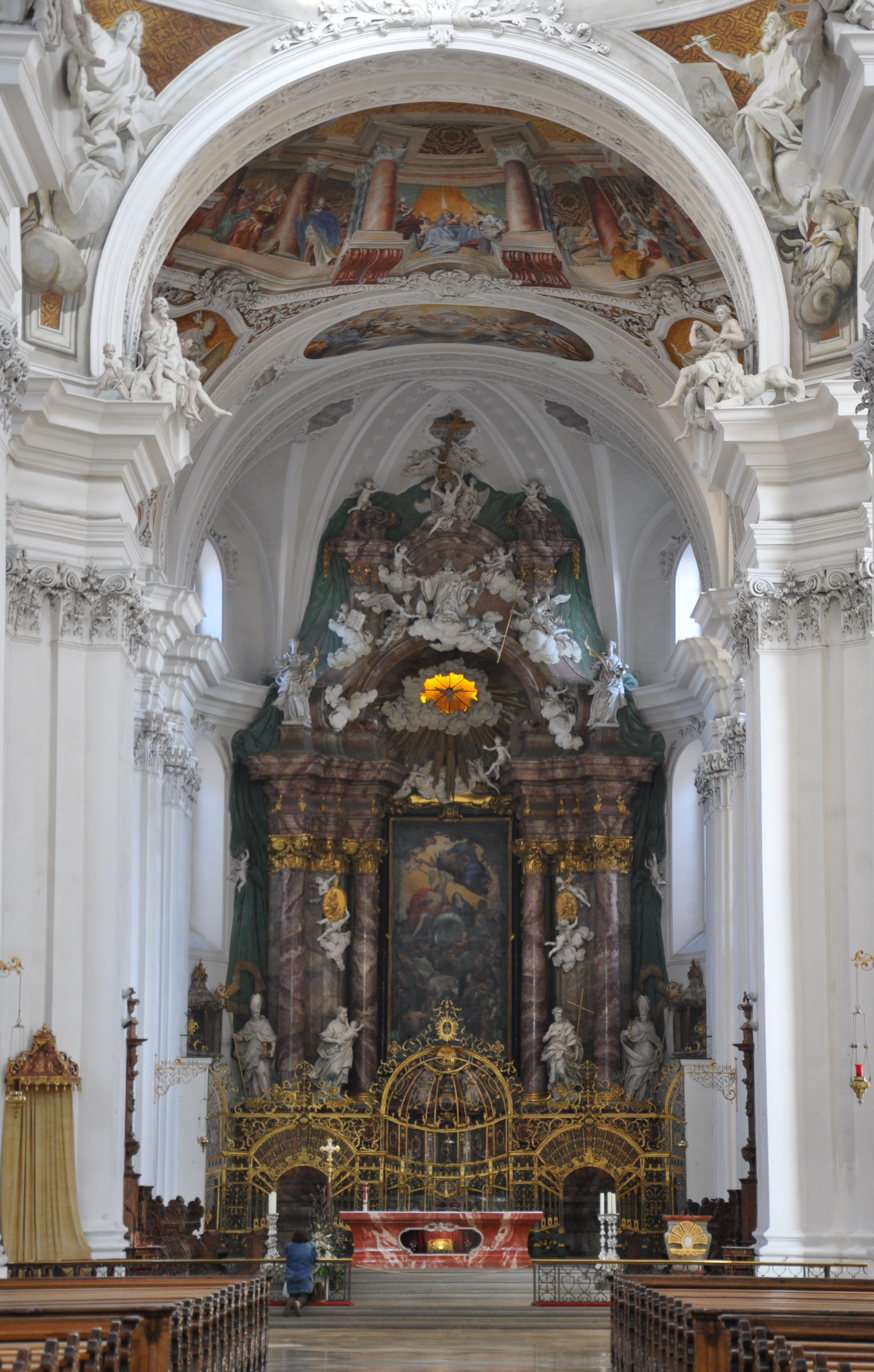
- High altar of the Basilica of St. Martin and St. Oswald, Weingarten (Württemberg). Altar structure and scagliola work by Giacomo Antonio Corbellini, 1718.
- Born: 1674; Como, Duchy of Milan
- Died: 1742 (aged 67–68); Laffio, Duchy of Milan
- Occupation: Stuccoist
- Movement: Baroque

Giacomo Antonio Corbellini (1674 – 1742) was an Italian Baroque stuccoist. He is noted for his work in the modern Czech Republic, in the domains of the Dietrichstein family, and at Ludwigsburg Palace in Germany.

== Biography ==
Giacomo Antonio Corbellini was born in 1674, either in Lugano or Laino, near Como.

Corbellini began working in southern Moravia for the Dietrichstein family at the garden of Mikulov Castle. Three years later, while still working at Mikulov Castle, Corbellini was tasked with decorating its chapel in stucco. In 1705, he helped make repairs to Church of Saint Nicholas in Nepomyšl, then produced the altar of Church of All Saints in Libochovice the next year. Corbellini was again working in Libochovice, this time at the Libochovice Castle, repairing stucco ceilings, in 1707. In 1707–1708, Corbellini created the stucco decoration and pulpit of Church of the Assumption of the Virgin Mary in Polná.

In 1711, Corbellini moved to Prague, where he named his first son, Paolo.

After a few years in Prague, where he has no recorded works, Corbellini moved to and lived in Osek from 1713 to 1718. There, he produced for the local monastery its stuccoed altar and decor.

In 1718, Corbellini moved to Ludwigsburg, then capital of the Duchy of Württemberg, where his brother-in-law, Donato Giuseppe Frisoni, worked as chief architect on a new ducal palace. At Ludwigsburg Corbellini was tasked with the production of scagliola. In the same area, and again under Frisoni's direction, Corbellini worked at St. Martin's Basilica in Weingarten.

Corbellini returned to Italy in 1733 to live at Laffio, where he died in 1742.
