= Ludwigsburg Palace =

Palace in Baden-Württemberg, Germany

- Residenzschloss Ludwigsburg
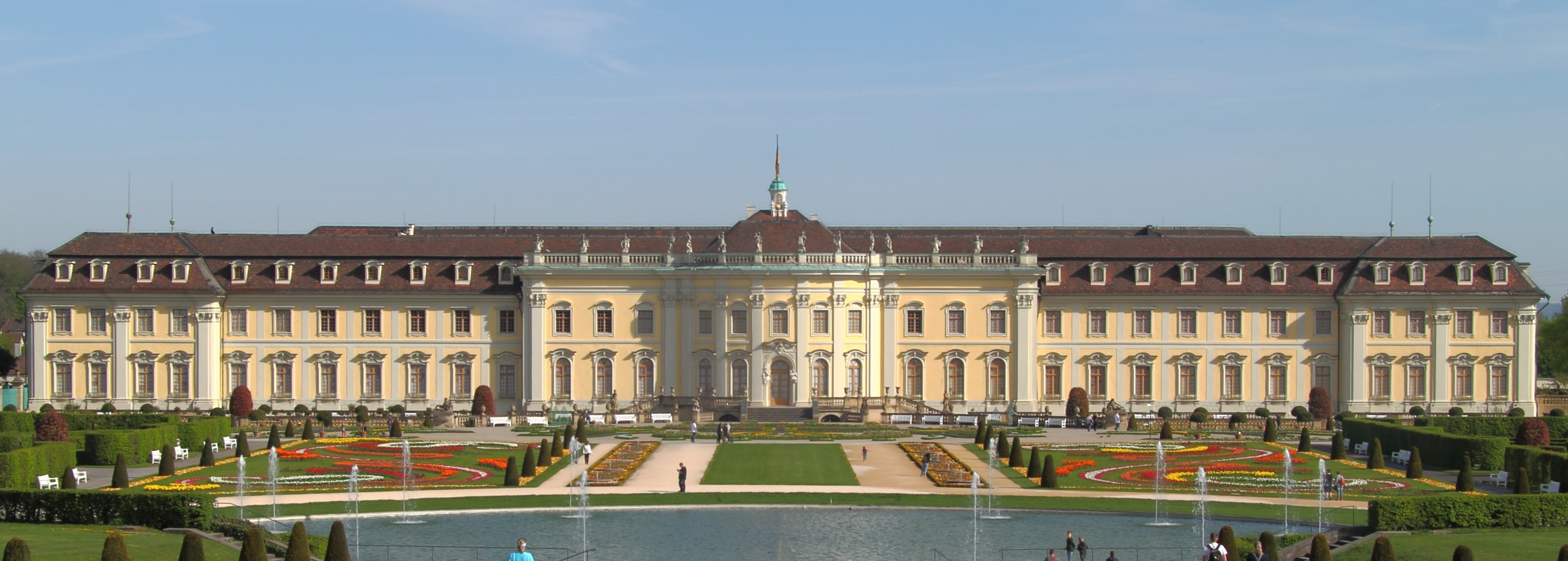
- Neuer Hauptbau and Blooming Baroque gardens from south

- Location within Baden-Württemberg Location within Germany

General information
- Location: Ludwigsburg, Germany
- Coordinates: 48°54′0″N 9°11′45″E
- Construction started: 1704
- Completed: 1733
- Cost: 3,000,000 florins
- Client: House of Württemberg
- Owner: Baden-Württemberg

Website
- www.schloss-ludwigsburg.de/en/home/

Ludwigsburg Palace, nicknamed the "Versailles of Swabia", is a 452-room palace complex of 18 buildings located in Ludwigsburg, Baden-Württemberg, Germany. Its total area, including the gardens, is 32 ha (79 acres) – the largest palatial estate in the country. The palace has four wings: the northern wing, the Alter Hauptbau, is the oldest and was used as a residence of the Duke of Württemberg; the east and west wings were used for court purposes and housing guests and courtiers; the southern wing, the Neuer Hauptbau, was built to house more court functions and was later used as a residence.

Eberhard Louis, Duke of Württemberg, appointed Philipp Joseph Jenisch to direct the work, and construction began in 1704. In 1707, Jenisch was replaced by Johann Friedrich Nette, who completed most of the palace and surrounding gardens. Nette died in 1714, and Donato Giuseppe Frisoni finished much of the palace façades. In the final year of construction, Eberhard Louis died, and the Neue Hauptbau's interiors were left incomplete. Charles Eugene's court architect, Philippe de La Guêpière, completed and refurbished parts of the New Hauptbau in the Rococo style, especially the palace theatre. Charles Eugene abandoned the palace for Stuttgart in 1775. Duke Frederick II, later King Frederick I, began using Ludwigsburg as his summer residence in the last years of Charles Eugene's reign. Frederick and his wife Charlotte, Princess Royal, resided at Ludwigsburg and employed Nikolaus Friedrich von Thouret to renovate the palace in the Neoclassical style. Thouret converted much of Ludwigsburg's interiors over the reign of Frederick and the later life of Charlotte. As a result of each architect's work, Ludwigsburg is a combination of Baroque, Rococo, Neoclassical, and Empire style architecture.

The constitutions of the Kingdom and Free People's State of Württemberg were ratified at Ludwigsburg Palace, in 1819 and 1919 respectively. It was the residence for four of Württemberg's monarchs and some other members of the House of Württemberg and their families. The palace was opened to the public in 1918 and survived World War II intact. It underwent periods of restoration in the 1950s, 1960s, and 1990s and again for the palace's 300th anniversary in 2004. The palace had more than 350,000 visitors in 2017 and has hosted the Ludwigsburg Festival every year since 1947.

Surrounding the palace are the Blooming Baroque (Blühendes Barock) gardens, arranged in 1954 as they might have appeared in 1800. Nearby is Schloss Favorite, a hunting lodge built in 1717 by Frisoni. Within the palace are two museums operated by the Landesmuseum Württemberg dedicated to fashion and porcelain respectively.

== History ==
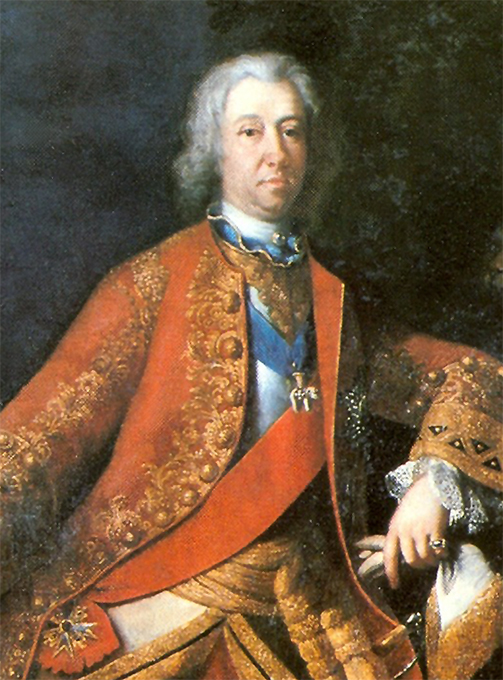
Eberhard Louis, Duke of Württemberg, known in German as Eberhard Ludwig, as he appeared in 1720

"Ludwigsburg", meaning "Louis's castle", was named after its builder, Eberhard Louis, Duke of Württemberg, in 1705. It was built on the site of a hunting estate and lodge owned by the dukes of Württemberg. This was destroyed by invading French troops in 1692, during the Nine Years' War, and replaced by another lodge built from 1697 to 1701. The beginning in 1701 of another war, the War of the Spanish Succession, against France and Bavaria, interrupted construction of this lodge, though Württemberg deferred entering the war until late 1702. Württemberg was subsequently invaded by France and Bavaria, but in 1704, the Bavarian elector was defeated at the Battle of Blenheim and exiled, and Bavaria was occupied. Eberhard Louis, a participant of Blenheim and the subsequent occupation, spent the winter of 1705–06 at the elector's residence, Nymphenburg Palace. Eberhard Louis used these developments to press claims to Bavarian lands, but illegally occupied the claimed lands. He was further undone by another French invasion of Württemberg in 1707 that resulted in the destruction of his capital and the flight of his family to Switzerland. Eberhard Louis's designs were at last defeated by the Treaty of Utrecht in 1713, which restored the territory and title of the Bavarian elector. Unable to compete with Bavaria militarily or politically, and desiring to sideline the influence of the Estates of Württemberg, Eberhard Louis decided instead to compete culturally and build a new palace and town inspired by Versailles, which would be the center of his domestic society and diplomacy. Located 10 kilometers (6.2 mi) from Stuttgart, Eberhard Louis could set up a court with his mistress, Wilhelmine von Grävenitz, and demonstrate his absolutist status as a monarch.

Construction of Ludwigsburg Palace had officially begun in May 1704 with the laying of the Alter Hauptbau's cornerstone by Eberhard Louis. The year before, he sent Philipp Joseph Jenisch to study architecture abroad, and himself studied architecture while staying at Nymphenburg. Upon Jenisch's return the next year, Eberhard Louis appointed him director of construction. Jenisch, however, only managed to finish the Alter Hauptbau's (Old main building) first floor and some of the southern garden before falling out of the duke's favor in 1707. Jenisch was replaced in 1707 with Johann Friedrich Nette, an engineer. By 1709, it had become apparent that the massive undertaking of the palace's construction eventually necessitated the building of a town, also known as Ludwigsburg. That cost of construction provoked financial consequences, opposition at court, and criticism from the populace.

=== Construction ===
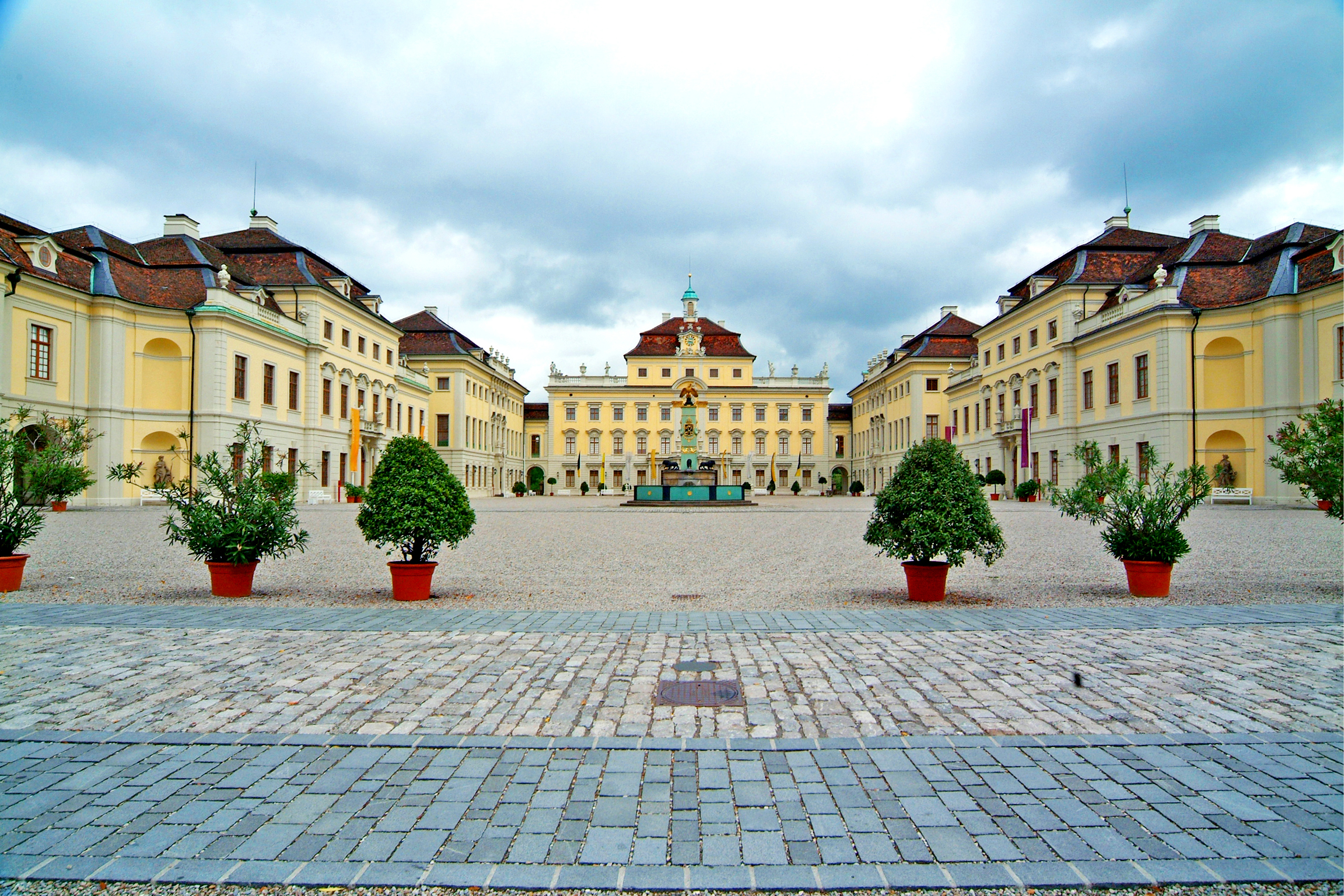
Courtyard, looking north at the corps de logis of the Alter Hauptbau. Nette began and finished most of the structures depicted.

Nette was now charged with building a complete Baroque palace from Jenisch's central corps de logis, to which an east wing and a west wing were to be added, aligned at 11°. Nette based his plans on those of Jenisch, enabling him to complete his design for a three-wing palace in the same year as his appointment. The galleries of the Alter Hauptbau were completed in 1707, then the corps de logis the next year. The Ordensbau and Riesenbau were constructed from 1709 to 1713, and their interiors were completed in 1714. Nette began the interior of the Alter Hauptbau, which he would never finish. Construction of the building's pavilions dragged on into 1722. Nette made two trips to Prague and his native Brandenburg to expand his pool of talent. He hired Johann Jakob Stevens von Steinfels, Tomasso Soldati, and Donato Giuseppe Frisoni in 1708, Andreas Quitainner in 1709, and then Luca Antonio Colomba, Riccardo Retti and Diego Francesco Carlone. Nette fled to Paris from an accusation of embezzlement from Jenisch's allies but was ordered back to Ludwigsburg by Eberhard Louis. On his return trip, he died suddenly of a stroke on 9 December 1714 in Nancy at the age of 41. At the time of his death, most of the northern section of the modern palace and its northern garden was complete.

Eberhard Louis thwarted an attempt by Jenisch to get the director job again and replaced Nette in 1715 with Frisoni. Frisoni, although having no formal training in architecture, enjoyed the support of the court chamberlain and impressed the duke with his stucco work in the Alter Hauptbau. Frisoni resumed construction with the palace's churches, beginning the Schlosskapelle in 1716 and the Ordenskapelle in 1720, then finished the Kavalierbauten in 1722. Frisoni also added the mansard roof to the top of the Alter Hauptbau, as its flat roof was prone to water damage. This had become a common issue with Nette's work because of the pressure the duke placed on him to finish the palace as soon as possible. Frisoni's work thus far led him to believe that he did not have a large enough talent pool to satisfy the duke's desires for the palace and town, so Frisoni brought in Giacomo Antonio Corbellini and Paolo Retti, his brother and son-in-law respectively, who were followed by Diego Francesco Carlone in 1718.

In 1721, the duke began to run out of room in the Alter Hauptbau for the functions of his court and Frisoni began planning to enlarge it. The duke dismissed the idea in 1724 and ordered Frisoni to construct the Neuer Hauptbau. Frisoni designed a four-story structure, double the height of the existing palace, but plans changed several times after construction began in 1725 atop the first terrace of the south garden. Frisoni settled on a three-story building that still afforded Eberhard Louis six rooms for his suite to the three in the Alter Hauptbau. To connect the Neuer Hauptbau to the existing palace, Frisoni built the Bildergalerie and Festinbau on the west side, and the Ahnengalerie and Schlosstheater (Palace theater) on the east. The Bildergalerie and Ahnengalerie were decorated from 1731 to 1733. With the exception of the interiors of the Neuer Hauptbau and Schlosstheater, all work was finished in 1733, but Eberhard Louis died that same year. Only a few rooms in the west end of the Neuer Hauptbau had been completed when he died. Construction of the Neuer Hauptbau and its connecting galleries cost 465,000 guilders and was managed by Paolo Retti, who at times had more than 650 stone masons, cutters, and basic laborers working on the facades between 1726 and 1728. Construction of Ludwigsburg Palace cost the Duchy of Württemberg 3,000,000 florins.

=== Residence ===
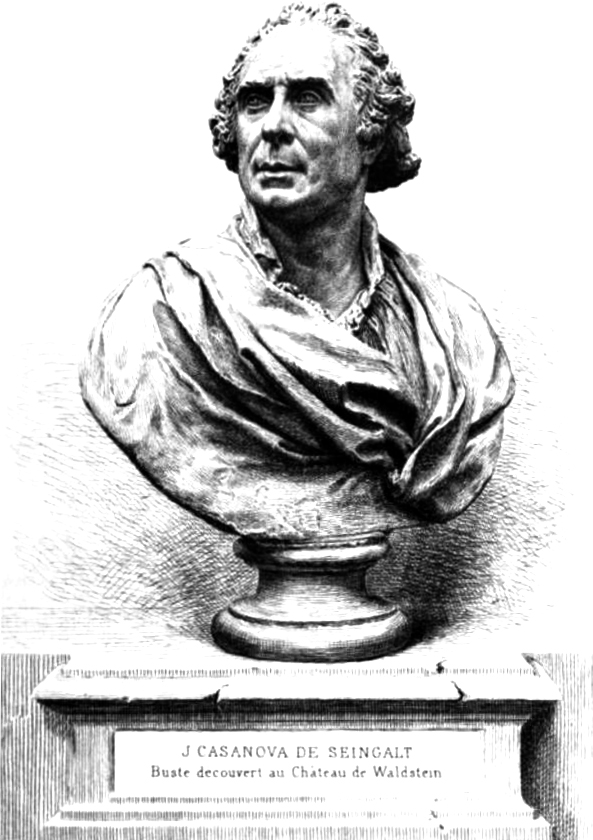
In 1760, Giacomo Casanova was a guest at Charles Eugene's court. During his stay, he praised the performances of the duke's orchestra.

Eberhard Louis left no heirs and was succeeded by Charles Alexander. Charles Alexander ended funding for the palace, dismissed its staff, and moved the capital back to Stuttgart in 1733 to modernize Württemberg's army and fortifications. As central figures in the construction of what was now decried as the "sin palace", Frisoni and Paolo Retti were arrested in 1733 on fraudulent charges of embezzlement. The two men were acquitted in 1735 after they paid a hefty fine to the ducal treasury, despite attempted intervention by Charles William Frederick, Margrave of Brandenburg-Ansbach to free them earlier. Frisoni died in Ludwigsburg on 29 November 1735. Charles Alexander himself died suddenly two years later on 12 March 1737 as he prepared to leave Ludwigsburg Palace to inspect the duchy's fortresses. After his death, the nine-year-old Charles Eugene became Duke, beginning a regency that lasted until 1744.

Charles Eugene began the construction of a new palace in Stuttgart in 1746 but unofficially used Ludwigsburg as his residence until 1775. The function of certain rooms at Ludwigsburg changed frequently; Johann Christoph David von Leger converted the Ordenskapelle to a Lutheran church from 1746 to 1748 for Duchess Elisabeth Fredericka Sophie. Beginning in 1757 and lasting into the next year, the suites of the beletage were extensively modified by Philippe de La Guêpière. La Guêpière completed the Schlosstheater in 1758–59, adding a stage, machinery, and the auditorium. A wooden opera house, adorned with mirrors, was constructed in 1764–65, located east of the Alter Hauptbau. Although Charles Eugene officially declared Ludwigsburg Palace his residence in 1764, he made no further modifications after 1770. The palace that had hosted a court that Giacomo Casanova called "the most magnificent in Europe" began a steady decline. Charles Eugene died without a legitimate heir in 1793 and was succeeded by his brother, Frederick II Eugene, who was succeeded by his son Frederick II in 1797. Ludwigsburg Palace had already been Frederick II's summer residence since 1795, and he continued to use it as such with Duchess Charlotte after marrying her on 18 May 1797.

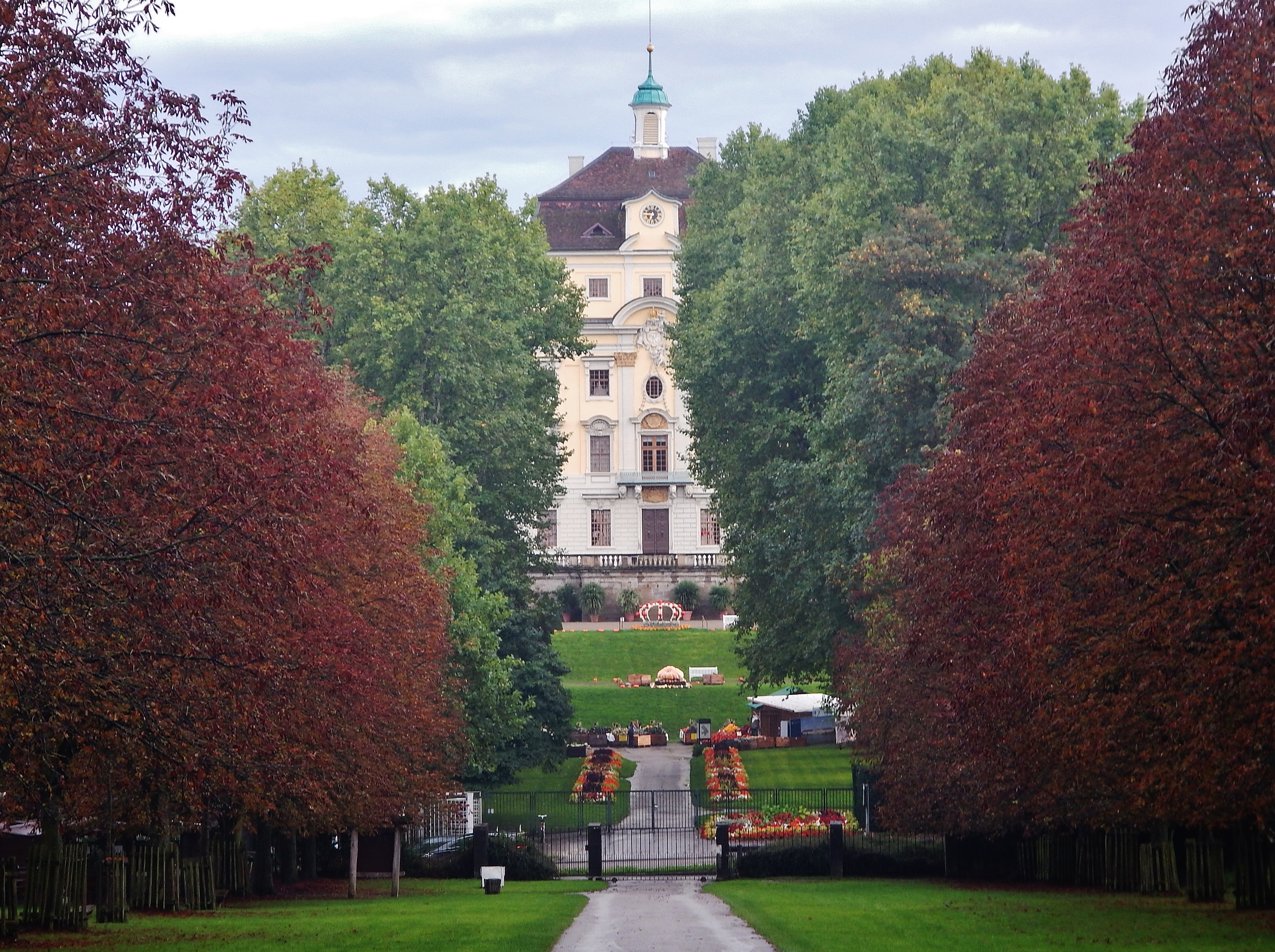
The main palace from Schloss Favorite

Napoleon's armies occupied Württemberg from 1800 to 1801, forcing the duke and duchess to flee to Vienna. The royals returned when Frederick II agreed in 1803 to pledge allegiance to Napoleon and part with Württemberg's territory on the Left Bank of the Rhine, an area of 388 square kilometers (150 sq mi). In exchange, according to the Treaty of Lunéville, Frederick II was named a Prince-elector and given 1,609 square kilometers (621 sq mi) of mediatised Right Bank territory. Frederick II, now Elector Frederick I, tasked his court architect Nikolaus Friedrich von Thouret with renovating the palace in the Neoclassical style. Thouret started in the Ahengalerie and the Ordensbau, working there from 1803 to 1806. For two days in October 1805, Napoleon visited Ludwigsburg to coerce Frederick I into joining the Confederation of the Rhine and thus becoming his ally, compensating Württemberg with neighboring territories in the Holy Roman Empire and Frederick I with the title of king. Frederick I again tasked Thouret with a remodeling, from 1808 to 1811, of the Ordenskapelle and the king's apartment. The final modernizations ordered by the king took place from 1812 to 1816 in the Schlosstheater and Marble Hall. During this time, the ceiling frescoes of the Guard Room and the main staircases of the Neuer Hauptbau were repainted. By the time Frederick I died in 1816, the majority of the palace had been converted to reflect the latest style.

Following her husband's death, Charlotte continued to reside at Ludwigsburg, receiving visitors such as her siblings. She tasked Thouret with the renovation of her own apartment, which was carried out between 1816 and 1824. The dowager queen died at the palace on 5 October 1828 following a bout of apoplexy. Charlotte was the last ruler of Württemberg to reside at Ludwigsburg, as Frederick's son and successor, William I, and future kings did not show any interest in the palace. Members of the House of Württemberg continued to reside at the palace into the early 20th century, while the Württembergs moved to Bebenhausen Abbey after the abolition of the monarchy in 1918.

=== Later history ===
In 1817, ownership of Ludwigsburg Palace passed from the House of Württemberg to the government of the Kingdom of Württemberg, which established offices there the next year. King William I chose the Order Hall, the throne room of his father, for the ratification of the kingdom's constitution in 1819. The palace's first restoration took place at the Alter Hauptbau in 1865.

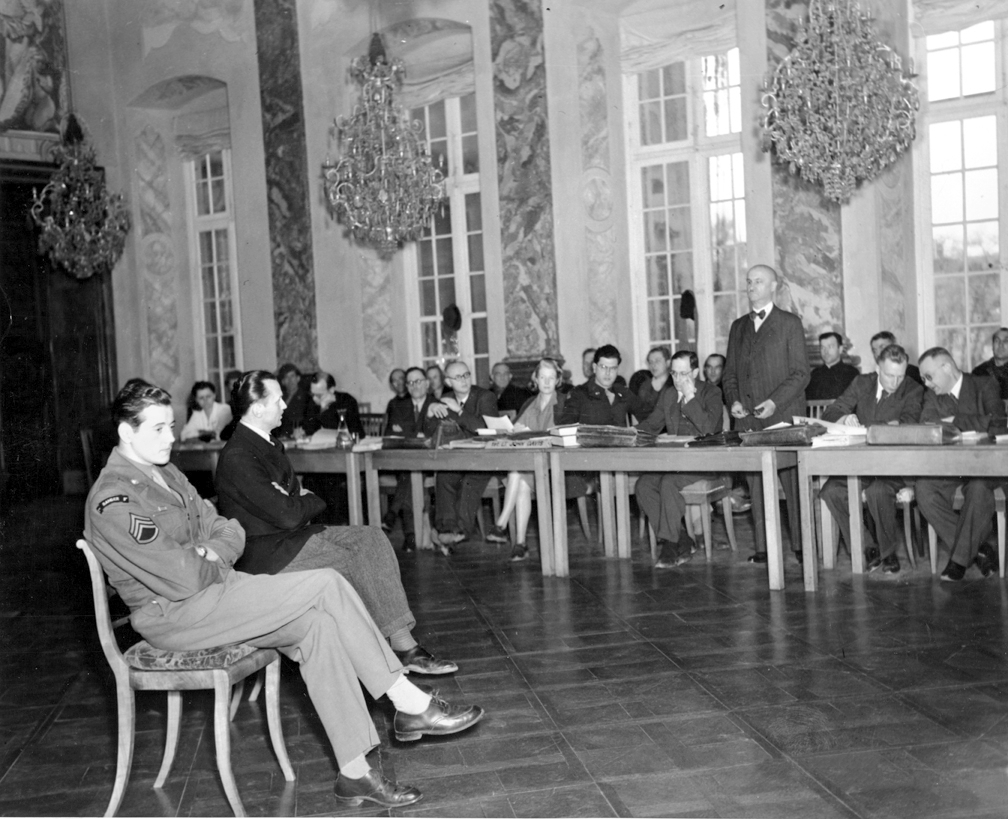
A defense counsel (standing) at the Borkum Island massacre trial questions a witness, in the foreground next to an American soldier who is acting as interpreter.

On 9 November 1918, the Kingdom of Württemberg was dissolved with the abdication of King William II. Ludwigsburg Palace was opened to the public that same year and a new constitution was ratified for the Free People's State of Württemberg on 12 January 1919. At this time, two apartments at Ludwigsburg Palace were still occupied by members of the House of Württemberg, Duke Ulrich and Princess Olga. The new state ordered them vacated until 1 April for the ratification. Ulrich moved out of Ludwigsburg in January, but Olga rented a new suite in the Neuer Hauptbau in February. She continued to reside at Ludwigsburg in her apartment with her family until her death in 1932.

The Schlosstheater hosted the Württemberg State Theatre for a production of Handel's Rodelinda in 1923, the first musical performance at the palace since 1853. In the early 1930s, Wilhelm Krämer began hosting the Ludwigsburger Schloßkonzerte (Ludwigsburg Palace Concerts), which comprised six to ten concerts annually from 1933 to 1939. The palace survived World War II unscathed, though its furnishings were removed in 1944–45 and held at the monasteries at Alpirsbach and Lorch. It was chosen as the site of the Borkum Island war crimes trial in 1946. The concerts resumed in 1947 with 34 performances, a record that would not be broken until 1979. In 1952, the concerts were packed into a single week as the Ludwigsburger Schloßtage ("Palace Days"). They gained national significance when President Theodor Heuss attended a production of Mozart's Titus two years later. The concerts were named Ludwigsburger Schloßfestspiele in 1966, and were internationally known as the Ludwigsburg Festival. In 1980, the state of Baden-Württemberg made the festival an official state event. On 9 September 1962, French President Charles de Gaulle delivered his "speech to the German youth" in the courtyard of Ludwigsburg Palace to 20,000 people.

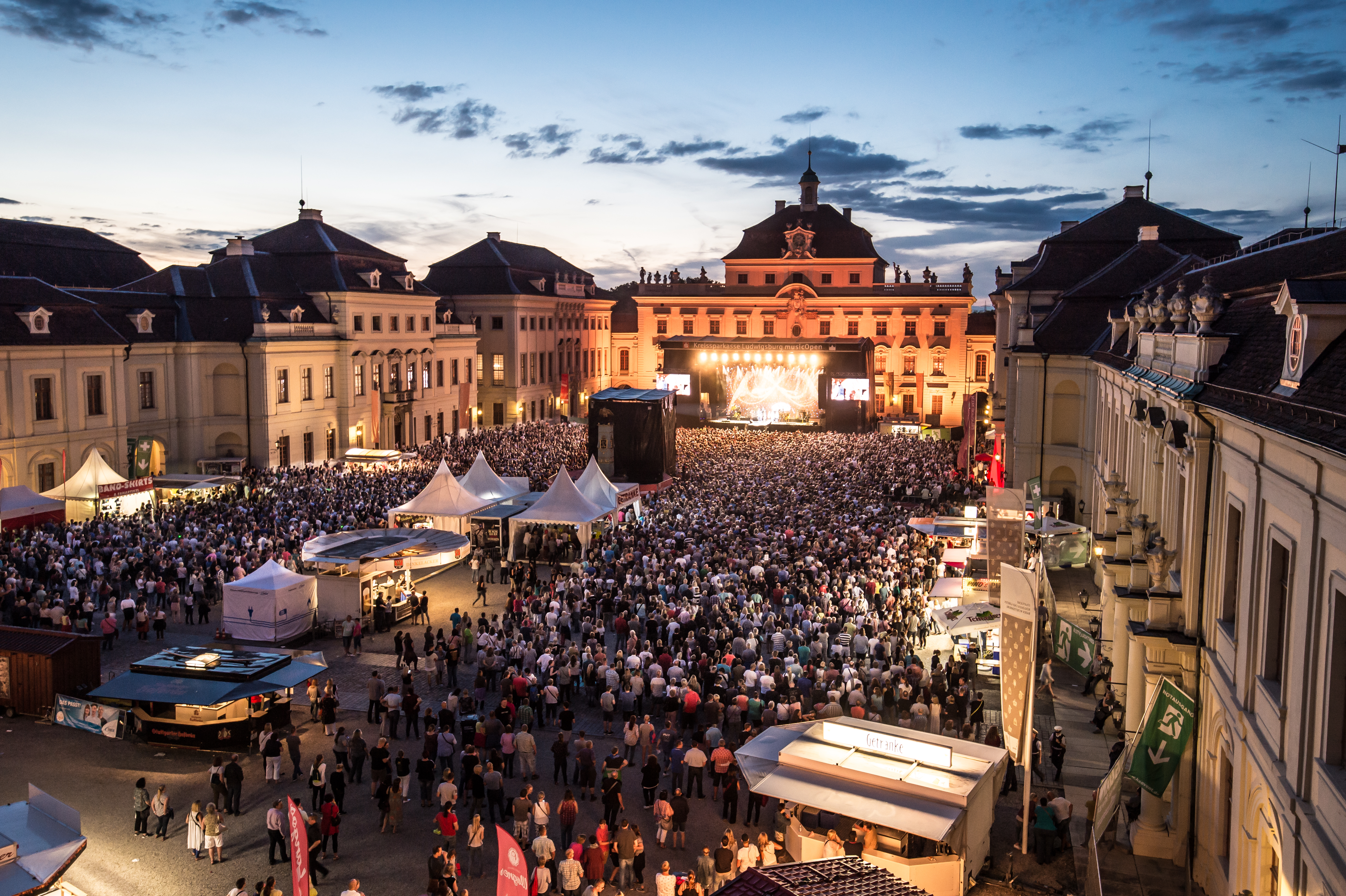
Revolverheld performing in the courtyard in August 2016

Restorations were undertaken in the 1950s and 1960s and again in the 1990s, in time for the palace's tricentenary in 2004. The anniversary was commemorated by the state government with three new museums. On 19 October 2011, Minister-President Winfried Kretschmann hosted a reception for the U.S. Army's 21st Theater Sustainment Command at the palace, which was attended by John D. Gardner, former deputy commander of EUCOM, and Gert Wessels, commander of all German troops in Baden-Württemberg. Ludwigsburg appeared again on Federal postage stamps in the Burgen und Schlösser series. The 50th anniversary of Charles de Gaulle's speech at Ludwigsburg was celebrated on 22 September 2012 and included appearances by German Chancellor Angela Merkel, Minister-President Kretschmann, and French President François Hollande. Merkel and Hollande both spoke at the event, the former directly referencing de Gaulle's speech in French. A painting of Frederick the Great on display was found to be a rare original by Antoine Pesne in November 2017. Michael Hörrmann – the director of the Staatliche Schlösser und Gärten Baden-Württemberg – valued the portrait at a minimum of €1 million. Baden-Württemberg's Minister of Finance, Edith Sitzmann visited Ludwigsburg to see the painting and attend a press conference, where she spoke about the cultural importance of Ludwigsburg Palace.

In 2017, 350,642 people visited Ludwigsburg Palace. By March 2020, Staatliche Schlösser und Gärten Baden-Württemberg plans to have spent €4 million to furnish the Neuer Hauptbau as it would have been during the reign of King Frederick I. To this end, about 500 paintings, 400 pieces of furniture, and 500 lamps, clocks, and sculptures – will be sourced, sorted, and restored.

As a result of the 2019-20 coronavirus pandemic, Staatliche Schlösser und Garten announced on 17 March 2020 the closure of all its monuments and cancellation of all events until 3 May. Monuments began reopening in early May, from 1 May to 17 May.

== Architecture ==
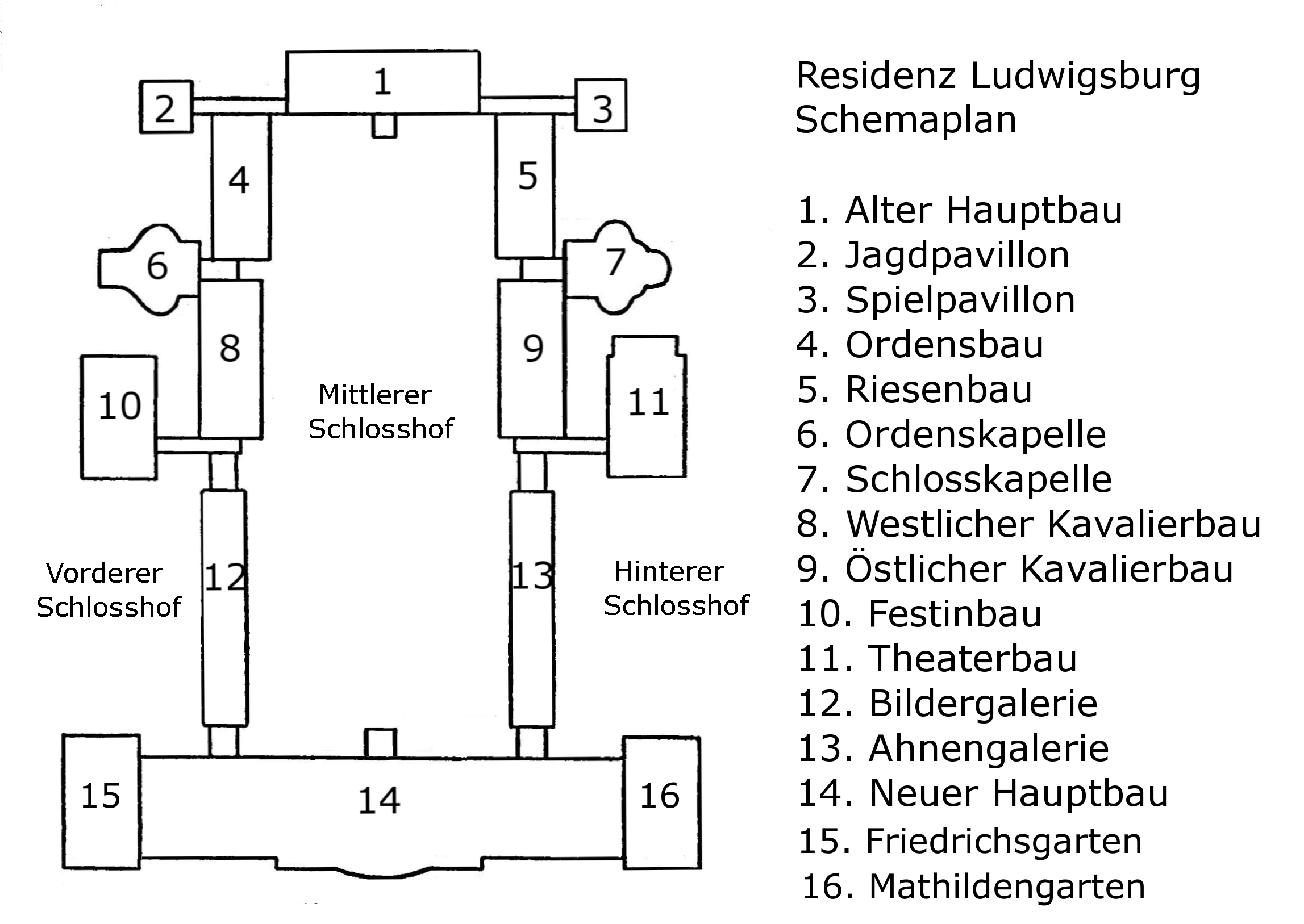
Plan of Ludwigsburg Palace as completed, in German

Ludwigsburg Palace's Baroque architecture was built under Eberhard Louis from 1704 to 1733 and is characterized by a great deal of Austrian and Czech Baroque influence. This is most evident in the two churches, which resemble the Hospital Church of Kuks and the Sanctuary Church of Steyr. The palace's two Baroque architects, Johann Friedrich Nette and Donato Frisoni, were educated and worked in Bohemia and hired staff experienced in the Bohemian style. Frisoni even knew or was related to some of the artisans who worked at the Steyr church. French influence is also present, for example in the mirror halls in both the corps de logis and the palace's many mansard roofs. The combination of work by Germans (Philipp Jenisch and Nette) and Italians (Frisoni, Diego and Carlo Carlone, Giuseppe Baroffio, Scotti and Luca Antonio Colomba) produced a strong resemblance to late 17th century works in Prague and Vienna. Charles Eugene brought the Rococo style to Ludwigsburg in 1747 and his court architect, Philippe de La Guêpière, worked in that style until 1775.

Nikolaus Friedrich von Thouret, working with Antonio Isopi, renovated much of Ludwigsburg Palace for Frederick I and Charlotte Mathilde from 1797 to 1824. Thouret's work was heavily influenced by the French Imperial and Renaissance styles, the work of Charles Percier and Pierre François Léonard Fontaine, and Egyptian motifs that became popular in Europe with Napoleon's three-year Egyptian campaign. Isopi would simplify Thouret's plans, which were then carried out by the Biedermeier woodworker Johannes Klinckerfuß and court painter Jean Pernaux. As a result, the palace's Neoclassical architecture does not reflect a single style or correspond to any one designer.

=== North wing (Alter Hauptbau) ===
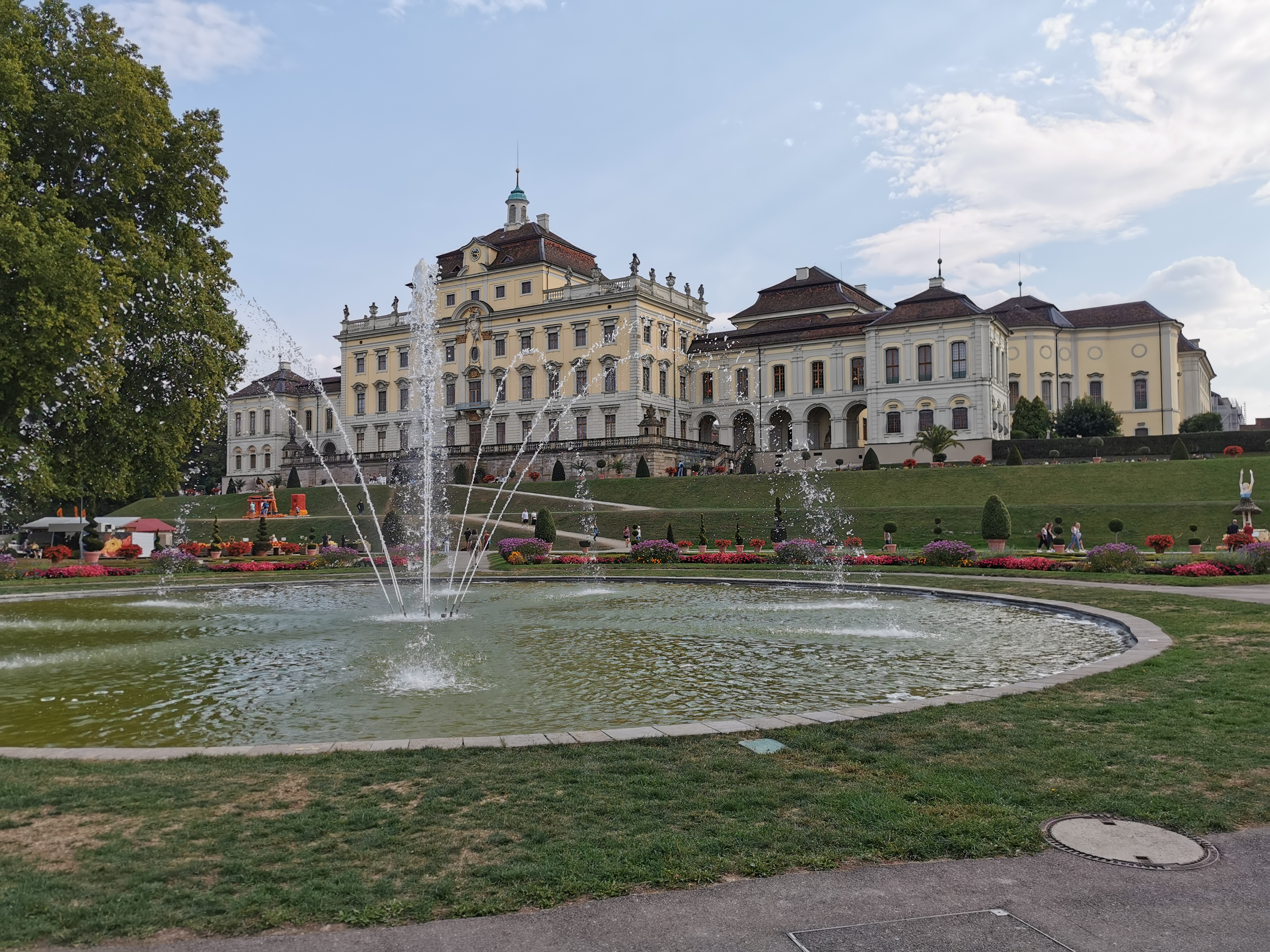
The old corps de logis

The north wing, referred to as the Alter Hauptbau (Old Main building), is the oldest portion of the palace. It was originally built to house the apartments of Eberhard Louis and Princess Henrietta Maria. Its facade was built from 1705 to 1708 and its interiors were mostly completed by 1715, although work inside its pavilions lasted into 1722. In 1809, and from 1826 to 1828, the rooms facing the courtyard in the beletage (main floor) were remodeled in the Neoclassical style, but their Baroque frescoes were revealed in 1865. The corps de logis opens with a wide vestibule, decorated by Frisoni in 1712, that terminates in an unadorned staircase. At the top of the stairs is a guard room and the four suites on the beletage. These follow the French Baroque model of a living room, audience chamber, and bedroom. Eberhard Louis's apartment features a hall of mirrors decorated with stucco by Frisoni and a hidden staircase, since removed, into the room of his mistress Wilhelmine von Grävenitz. The third floor, finished in 1708, houses two galleries. The first takes up most of the south wall and served as a portrait gallery and ahnentafel (table of ancestors), with stucco portraits of Eberhard Louis and his ancestors created by Frisoni and Soldati in 1713. The ceiling frescoes were lost in the 1808 renovation that divided into smaller rooms. The gallery was restored between 2000 and 2004. Above the third floor is a mansard roof that now houses Zwiefalten Abbey's original clockwork, taken by King Frederick I in 1809.

The two pavilions to the west and east of the corps de logis are connected to it by arcaded galleries, completed in 1713 and 1715 respectively, that close off the northern edge of the cour d'honneur. The western gallery celebrates peace with stucco statuary, medallions, and reliefs of the Judgement of Paris, Aeneas fleeing Troy, Hercules and Omphale, and Apollo and Daphne. Its terminus, the Jagdpavillon (Hunting pavilion), contains the Marmorsaletta (Little marble hall) decorated with scagliola by Riccardo Retti and frescoes by Luca Antonio Colomba. Adjoined to the hall are three cabinet rooms, the first and third of which are decorated with Turkish and Chinese imagery respectively. The eastern gallery celebrates war with stucco trophy captives and weapons, reliefs of Eberhard Louis's monogram, and depictions of the cardinal virtues and the classical elements. Spanning the entire gallery is Colomba's ceiling fresco of the war between the Olympian gods and the giants. At the end of the gallery is the Spielpavillon, completed in 1716, whose center is a rounded, cruciform hall with four corner rooms that contain imitation Delftware images of Jacques Callot's Grotesque Dwarves. The dome fresco by Colomba and Emanuel Wohlhaupter depicts the four seasons and their corresponding zodiac signs.

=== East wing ===
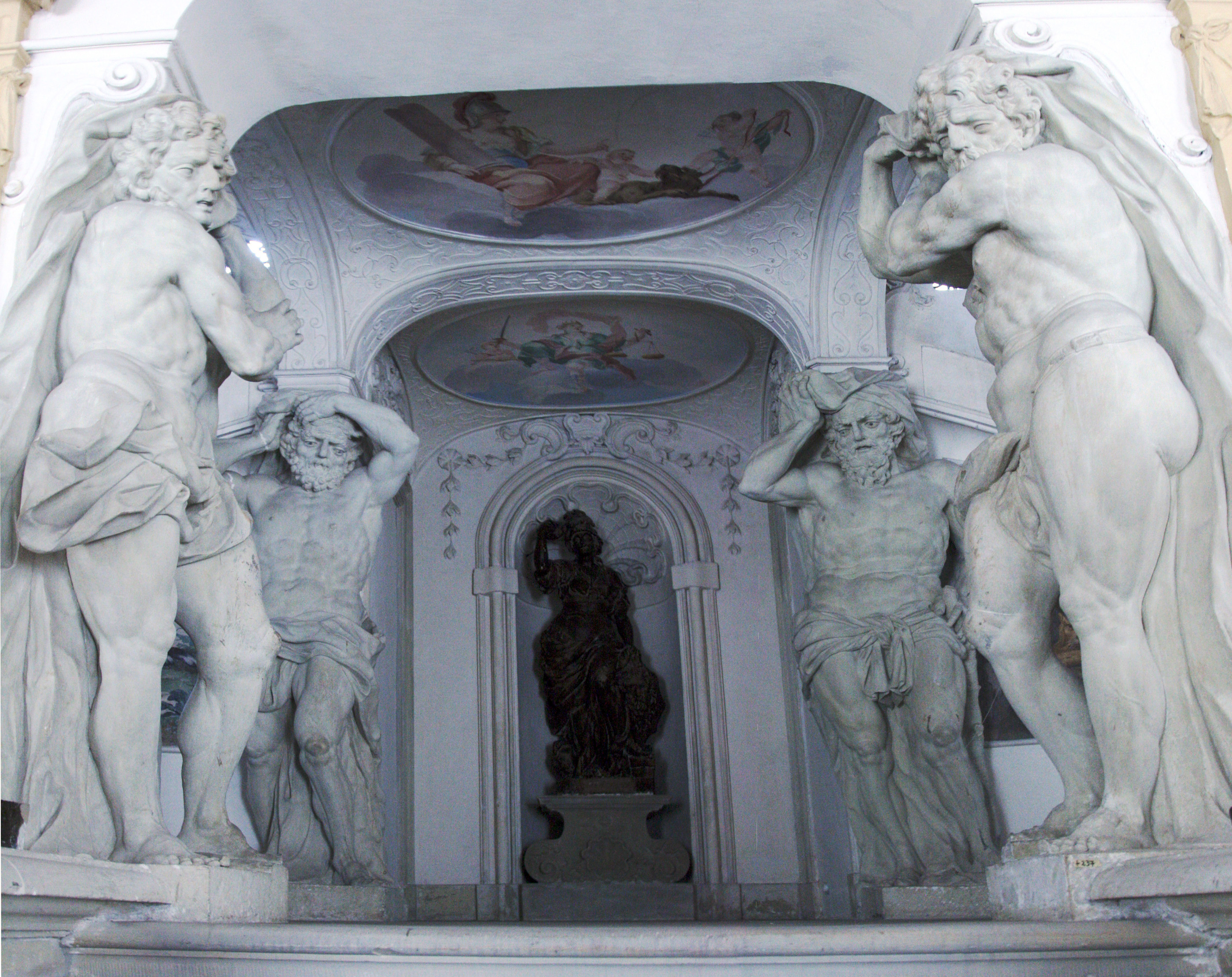
The Riesenbau's namesake giants in its vestibule

The first structure of the eastern wing is the Riesenbau (Giants' building), built by Johann Friedrich Nette in 1712–13. The vestibule, decorated by Andreas Quittainer and Colomba, prominently features two sphinxes and four giants as the atlases under the staircase to the beletage. Originally, these stairs led up to a room for the Hunting Order, which was segregated into residences from 1720 to 1723. Ahead of the giants is a statue of Minerva, and the frescoes on the ceiling above the staircase show Justitia and Fortitudo, the four seasons, and the four classical elements. In 1810, the rooms on the beletage were remodeled in the Neoclassical style, but they were restored to the Baroque style and opened as a museum in the 1950s. The apartments of Frederick Louis and Charles Alexander were decorated by Frisoni and Colomba, but Charles Alexander's apartment also features a landscape painting by Adolf Friedrich Harper.

Directly south of the Riesenbau is the Östlicher Kavalierbau (East Cavaliers' Building), built from 1715 to 1719 for housing courtiers. It contains four apartments on both floors, decorated with stucco ornament by Riccardo Retti and an original fresco on the ceiling of the beletage by Leopoldo Retti. The southwestern apartment on the second floor contains a museum dedicated to the Schlosstheater (Palace theater), attached by a gallery to the Östlicher Kavalierbau and the Schlosskapelle. Europe's oldest theater was constructed by Frisoni from 1729 to 1733 but was first furnished in 1758–59 by La Guêpière, who added the stage, auditorium, and machinery. Thouret remodeled the Schlosstheater in Neoclassical in 1811–12. Casanova is known to have visited the Schlosstheater, making notes on the performances held there.

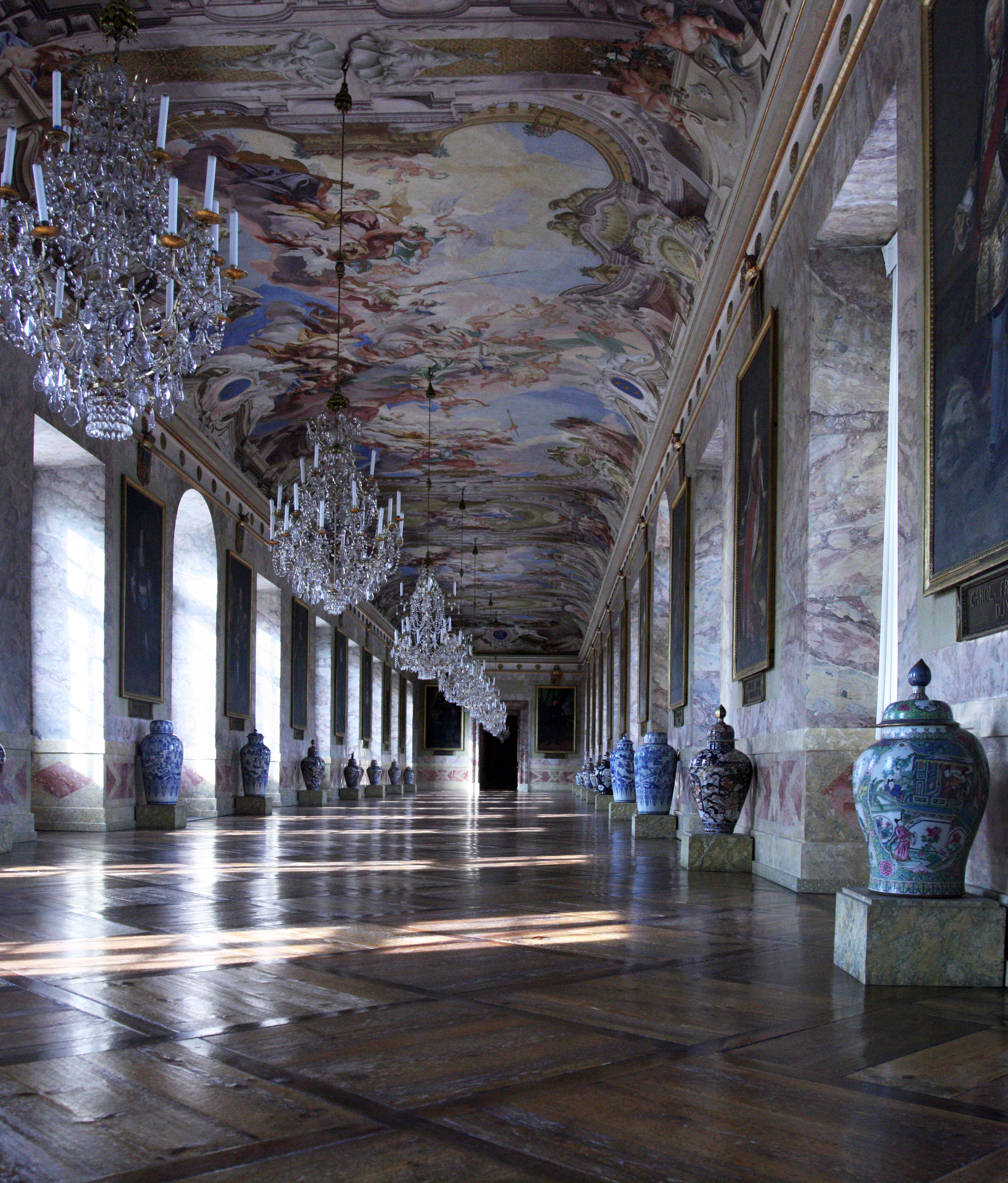
The Ahnengalerie, tracing the lineage of the House of Württemberg

The Schlosskapelle (Palace chapel) was built from 1716 to 1724. The chapel is made up of a rotunda with three semi-domes and a private box for the duke and his family, accessed from the second floor. The box was painted around 1731 with the story of David and given its red velvet wallpaper and a ceiling fresco by Livio Retti. The chapel was painted by Frisoni, Colomba, and Carlo Carlone, who were restricted by Protestant doctrine to illustrations of biblical topics, such as the Apostles and scenes from the Old Testament. A crypt under the chapel is the burial site of all rulers of Württemberg from Duke Eberhard Louis to King Frederick I. The Schlosskapelle did not receive any major remodeling in the 19th century.

The southernmost part of the east wing is the Ahnengalerie, built in 1729 and 490-foot (150 m) long. The original ceiling frescoes by Carlo Carlone, which illustrate the story of Achilles, were moved to the Bildergalerie after their completion in 1732. Instead, Carlone painted an homage to Eberhard Louis from 1731 to 1733, glorifying his reign with depictions of Alexander the Great, Apelles, Venus, Mars, Apollo, Phobos, and the Muses, among others. Frederick I had Thouret remodel the Ahnengalerie in 1805–06, retaining Carlone's frescoes and adding stucco to the two antechambers. The portraits in the Ahnengalerie trace the lineage of the rulers of Württemberg from Eberhard I the Bearded, the first Duke of Württemberg, to Wilhelm II, the last King of Württemberg.

=== West wing ===
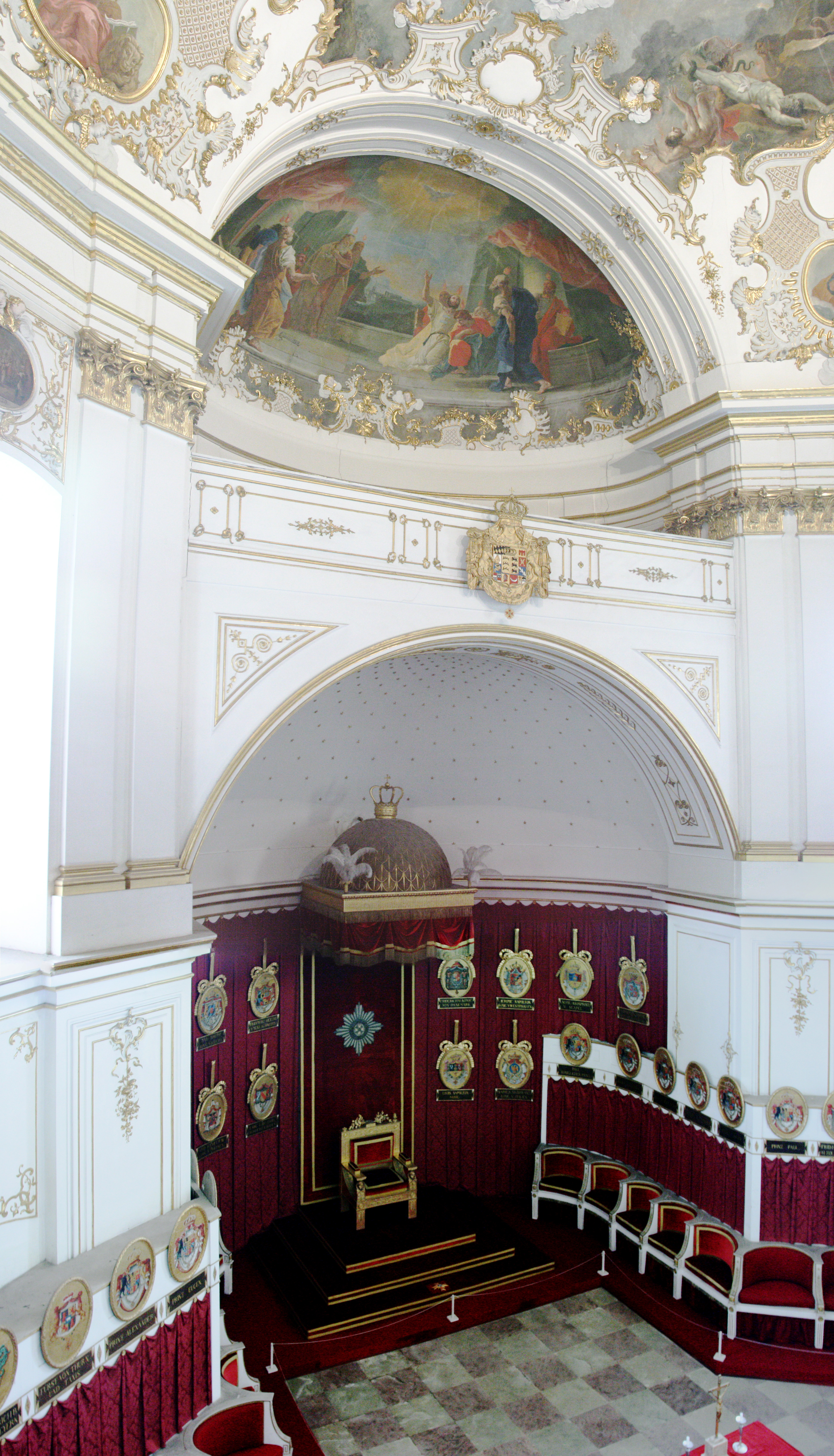
King Frederick I's throne in the Ordenskapelle

The first building of the west wing is the Ordensbau (Order building, in reference to the ducal Order of the Golden Eagle), containing three apartments on the ground floor and the banquet hall. The vestibule features a ceiling fresco of Pheme with a genius. Pictures of Hercules adorn its walls and continue into the stairwell. The antechamber of the Order Hall is decorated with stucco reliefs of cherubs, masks, birds, and weapons by Tomasso Soldati and Frisoni. The Order Hall's stucco was also by Soldati and Frisoni, but the ceiling fresco is a later repainting by Scotti and Baroffio in 1731, as the original by Colomba was damaged by water and removed. King Frederick I had the Hall renovated into a throne room in 1805–06 and moved the ceremonies of the Order to the Ordenskapelle. Thouret designed the king's throne and baldachin, opposite Johann Baptist Seele's 1808 portrait of the king. It was in the Order Hall that the constitutions of the Kingdom and the Free People's State of Württemberg were ratified in 1819 and 1919, respectively.

Immediately southwest of the Ordensbau is the oval Ordenskapelle (Order chapel), built from 1715 to 1723. The Ordenskapelle was remodeled from 1746 to 1748 by Johann Christoph David von Leger on behalf of Duke Charles Eugene for Duchess Elisabeth Fredericka. Leger removed the floor between the chapel and a second-floor Order hall and reused existing pilasters for new Rococo decor by Pietro Brilli. Retti painted scenes from the life of Jesus on the ceiling. On the second floor is the duchess's box, decorated in 1747–48 with stucco and frescoes of the birth of Christ and allegories of faith, hope, and love. In 1798, Frederick I moved the Ordenskapelle's church functions to the Schlosskapelle. Nine years later, he designated it for use by the Order of the Golden Eagle and tasked Thouret with remodeling it in the Empire style. Thouret walled up the first-floor windows in 1807–08 for additional seating room and for the king's canopied throne under its star-studded semidome.

The Westlicher Kavalierbau (West Cavaliers' building) is attached to the Ordenskapelle, identical in layout and design to its eastern counterpart. It was built in 1719–20, and retains some original stucco and ceiling frescoes by Riccardo and Retti. The Festinbau, attached to the Westlicher Kavalierbau, was originally designed as a kitchen built from 1729 to 1733, and used from 1770 to 1775 as a theater. Since 2004, the Westlicher Kavalierbau and Festinbau have housed a fashion museum. The actual kitchen, the Küchenbau, was built separate from the palace to its west, to keep odors and possible fires at bay. Inside are seven hearths, a bakery, a butcher's shop, several pantries, and the quarters for the servant staff in the attic and on the first floor.

The Bildergalerie (Picture gallery), the southernmost part of the west wing, was built by Frisoni in 1731–32. The only remaining Baroque decor is Scotti's ceiling fresco depicting the life of Achilles, which first adorned the ceiling of the Ahnengalerie. Thouret renovated the Bildergalerie in Tuscan Neoclassicism from 1803 to 1805, adding a fireplace by Isopi and a statue of Apollo opposite it. The frescoes in the Bildergalerie's antechambers were painted in 1730 by either Scotti or Carlo Carlone.

=== South wing (Neuer Hauptbau) ===
The south wing, the Neuer Hauptbau (New Main building), was designed and constructed by Frisoni on the order of Duke Eberhard Louis, who found that the Alter Hauptbau was too small to serve the needs of his court. Frisoni planned for a four-story building in 1725 but wound up building three stories. Eberhard Louis died before he could move into the Neuer Hauptbau, leaving its interiors unfinished until Duke Charles Eugene finished them in 1747, but abandoned the palace in 1775. The next royals to reside there were Württemberg's first King and Queen, Frederick I and Charlotte Mathilde, who extensively remodeled parts of the palace in the Neoclassical style from 1802 to 1824. The building was used in 1944–45 to store furnishings recovered from the recently destroyed New Palace in Stuttgart.

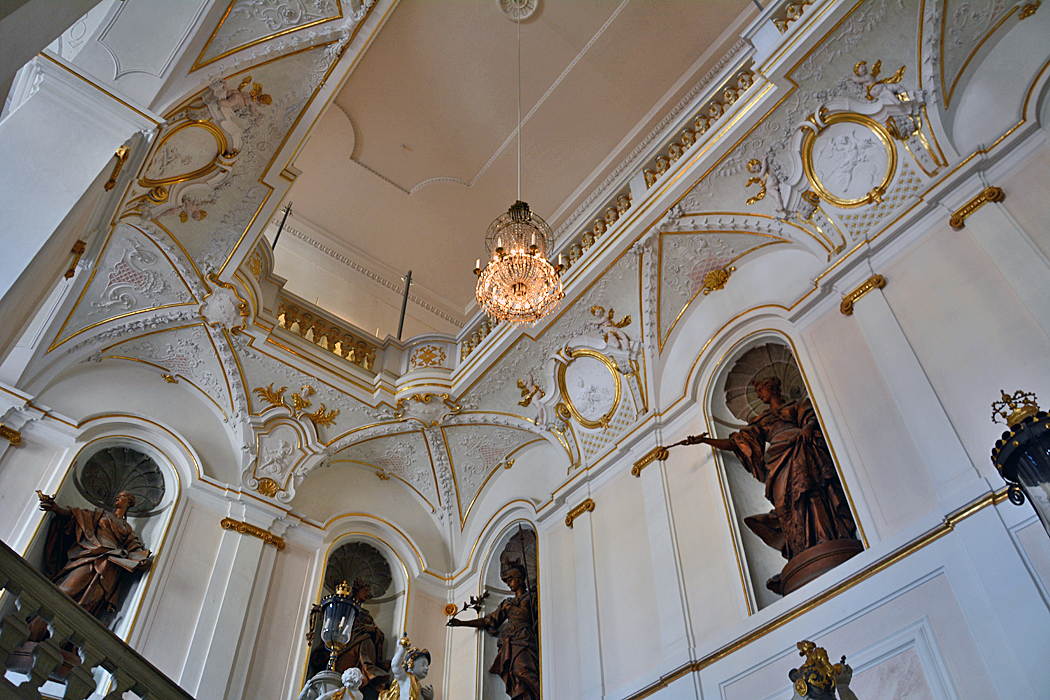
Statuary and ceiling of the Queen's Staircase

The Neuer Hauptbau opens with an oval vestibule decorated by Carlo Carlone. It houses a statue of Duke Eberhard Louis, surrounded by terms supporting the ceiling. In the niches behind the columns are statues of Apollo, a woman and a sphinx, and two maenads with a satyr. A vaulted passageway decorated with two figures of Hercules leads into a salon, featuring a ceiling fresco by Diego Carlone and statues of Roman deities in niches. The King's and Queen's Staircases bookend the vestibule and lead up to the Neuer Hauptbau's beletage. The King's Staircase has statuary themed after unhappy romances, and the cavettos above are adorned with stucco depictions of the seasons personified and medals bearing Eberhard Louis's initials. The Queen's Staircase is a mirror of the King's, but the statuary depicts virtues and the ribbonwork above displays Apollo, Artemis, and the four classical elements.

Two galleries lead from the stairs to a guardroom decorated by Diego Carlone in 1730 with stucco weapon trophies and fresco. Thouret covered over Carlone's work with Neoclassical ornamentation in 1815. The guardroom leads into the Marble Hall (Marmorsaal), the palatial dining hall once used to receive Francis II of Austria and Alexander I of Russia. Thouret began work here in 1813–14 by installing a new, curved ceiling and finished two years later with the Marble Hall's scagliola walls. Pilasters and windows form the lower wall, decorated with stucco garlands and candelabras by Antonio Isopi. Reproductions of the Medusa Rondanini, Hermes Ludovisi, and the Medici Vase are present around the doors. Above the hall is a walkway in the attica, divided by pillars clad with caryatids holding plates and pitchers designed by Johann Heinrich von Dannecker. The ceiling fresco, by Pernaux, is of a partly cloudy blue sky that contains an eagle and four smaller birds that each hoist a chandelier. The roof above the Marble Hall, though curved, has no visible supports. This was achieved by cantilevering its weight upon the entablatures at the top of the walls of the Marble Hall.

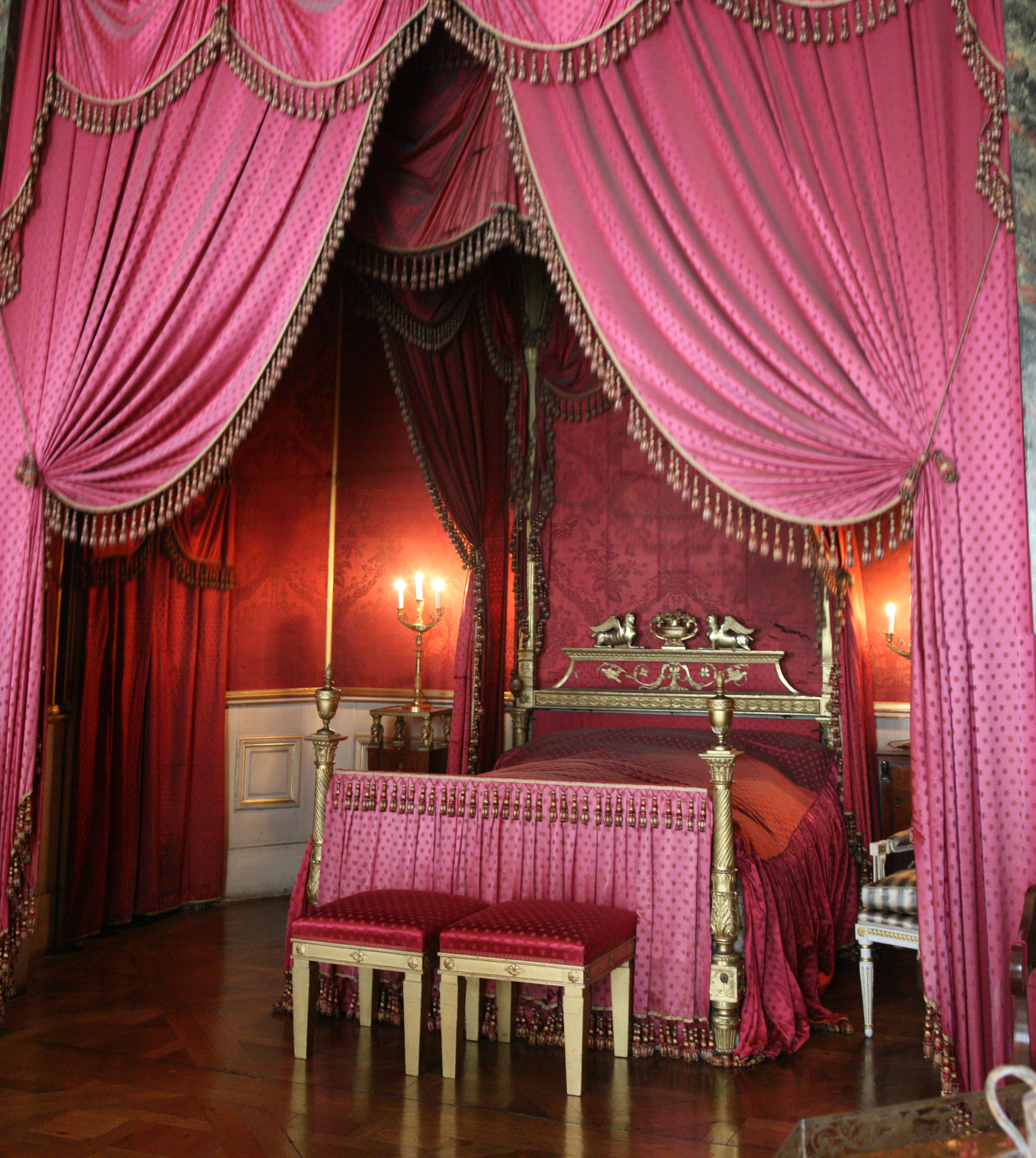
Queen Charlotte's bed

To the east of the Marble Hall is Queen Charlotte's apartment, originally the suites intended to house Prince Frederick Louis and Princess Henrietta Maria. When Charlotte joined Frederick I in residence at Ludwigsburg in 1798, the separating walls were removed to form one suite. Thouret only made small changes to the queen's suite from 1802 to 1806, principally adding damask to the primary antechamber and to the assembly and audience rooms. Extensive renovations, lasting from 1816 to 1824, came after the queen fully established herself at Ludwigsburg. Charlotte's audience chamber contains her throne, red silk walls, and paintings of Cybele, Minerva, and personified virtues by Viktor Heideloff over the doors and in the lunettes of the mirrors. The adjacent bedroom was remodeled in 1824 with marbled green pilasters and an alcove containing red silk from 1760. The study is unusual for a Neoclassical interior because of its large mirrors. Finally, there is the summer study and the queen's library, remodeled in 1818 with blue damask and Rococo overdoors that carry over into the library to the west. The entire apartment is furnished in the Biedermeier style by Johannes Klinckerfuß, whose work Charlotte herself covered with embroidery.

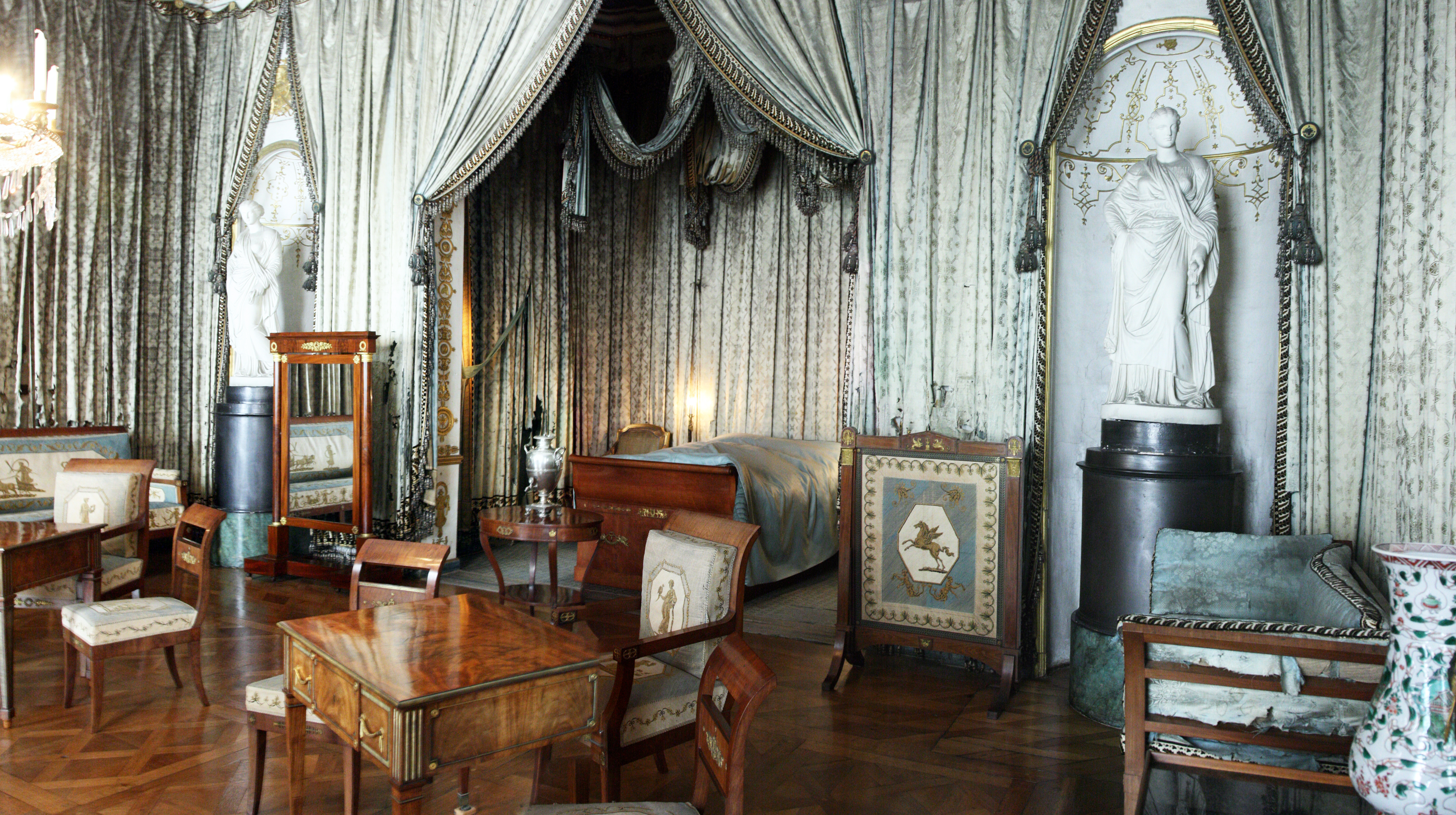
King Frederick's bedroom

The king's apartment, to the west of Charlotte's, was to house Duke Eberhard Louis and Wilhelmine von Grävenitz, and later Johanna Elisabeth of Baden-Durlach. Charles Eugene became the first to reside here in 1744 with his wife. When Frederick I took up residence, he had Thouret remodel his 12-room suite from 1802 to 1811. The suite opens with the antechamber, containing decorations dated to 1785, likely taken from Hohenheim Palace, and an original ceiling fresco by Carlo Carlone of Bacchus and Venus. Adjacent to it is the audience chamber, decorated with Baroque red damask and Neoclassical borders. The room contains Frederick's throne and furniture by Isopi, embellished with griffins in relief. Past the conference room and its Rococo overdoors by Heideloff are the king's bedchambers. The Baroque wooden wall paneling and overdoors survived the room's 1811 remodeling. The walls and furnishings of the king's office are Neoclassical, decorated with the heads of Greek gods and cornucopias, but the ceiling fresco is a Guibal original from 1779 of Chronos and Clio.

Duke Charles Eugene moved into the Neuer Hauptbau in 1757 and tasked La Guêpière with the apartment's decoration. Two years later, La Guêpière completed the entire suite except for the bedchamber, as the Duke occupied his wife's former suite in 1760 for his actual residence. The rest of the suite was used for social functions until it was emptied of furnishings in the next decade. A staircase and antechamber lead to the entrance of today's apartment, a gallery decorated by Ludovico Bossi. The initial rooms are the first and second antechambers, clad in green damask with portraits by Antoine Pesne and paneling by Michel Fressancourt, overdoors by Matthäus Günther, boiserie flooring, and furniture by Jacques-Philippe Carel and Jean-Baptiste Hédouin that Charles Eugene acquired around 1750. The Assembly Room, restored in 2003, prominently features overdoors by Adolf Friedrich Harper and trophies of musical instruments above the windows. Charles Eugene's third-floor residence begins with the Corner Room, again painted by Harper, which feeds into a cabinet room and then finally the bedchamber, completed in 1770. Bossi created the ceiling's stucco in 1759–60, but the room and its two closets took another decade to complete. Additional rooms on the third floor housed relatives of the rulers of Württemberg and these have been occupied by the Ceramics Museum since 2004.

== Grounds and gardens ==
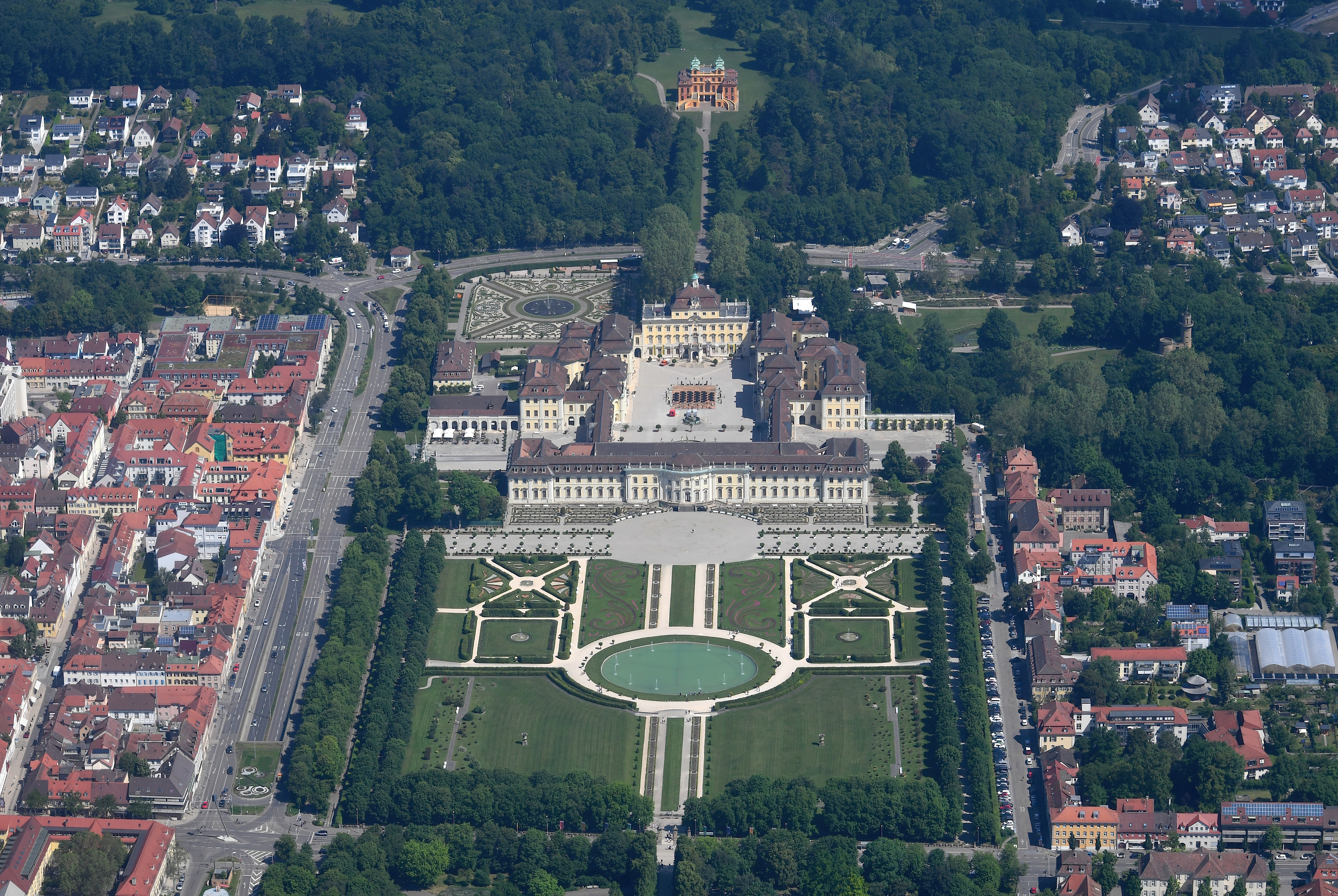
Aerial image of Ludwigsburg Palace, the palace gardens, and Schloss Favorite

The gardens were to be centered in the north with an Italian terraced garden and were largely completed when Eberhard Louis turned his attention to the south garden. There he laid out a large symmetrical French garden. Charles Eugene filled in the terraces in 1749 to replace them with a large broderie. He then reorganized and expanded the south garden over the next decade. Frederick I again reorganized the south garden in 1797 in a Neoclassical style and Mediterranean theme. He retained the original pathways, but added a canal and fountain to the garden's center. The south garden was divided into four equally sized lawns, with hillocks in their center topped with a large vase crafted by Antonio Isopi. Frederick also expanded the garden east to form an English landscape garden (Lower east) and demolished Charles Eugene's opera house to form a medieval-themed landscape garden (Upper east). Two additional gardens, for Frederick and Charlotte, were laid out adjacent to their palace suites. Also in the fantasy garden is the Emichsburg, a folly built from 1798 to 1802 and named after the fabled ancestor of the House of Württemberg, a knight of the House of Hohenstaufen. William I abandoned Ludwigsburg for Rosenstein Palace in Stuttgart and opened the south garden to the public in 1828. The canal was filled in and an orchard planted on the southern lawns, later used to grow potatoes.

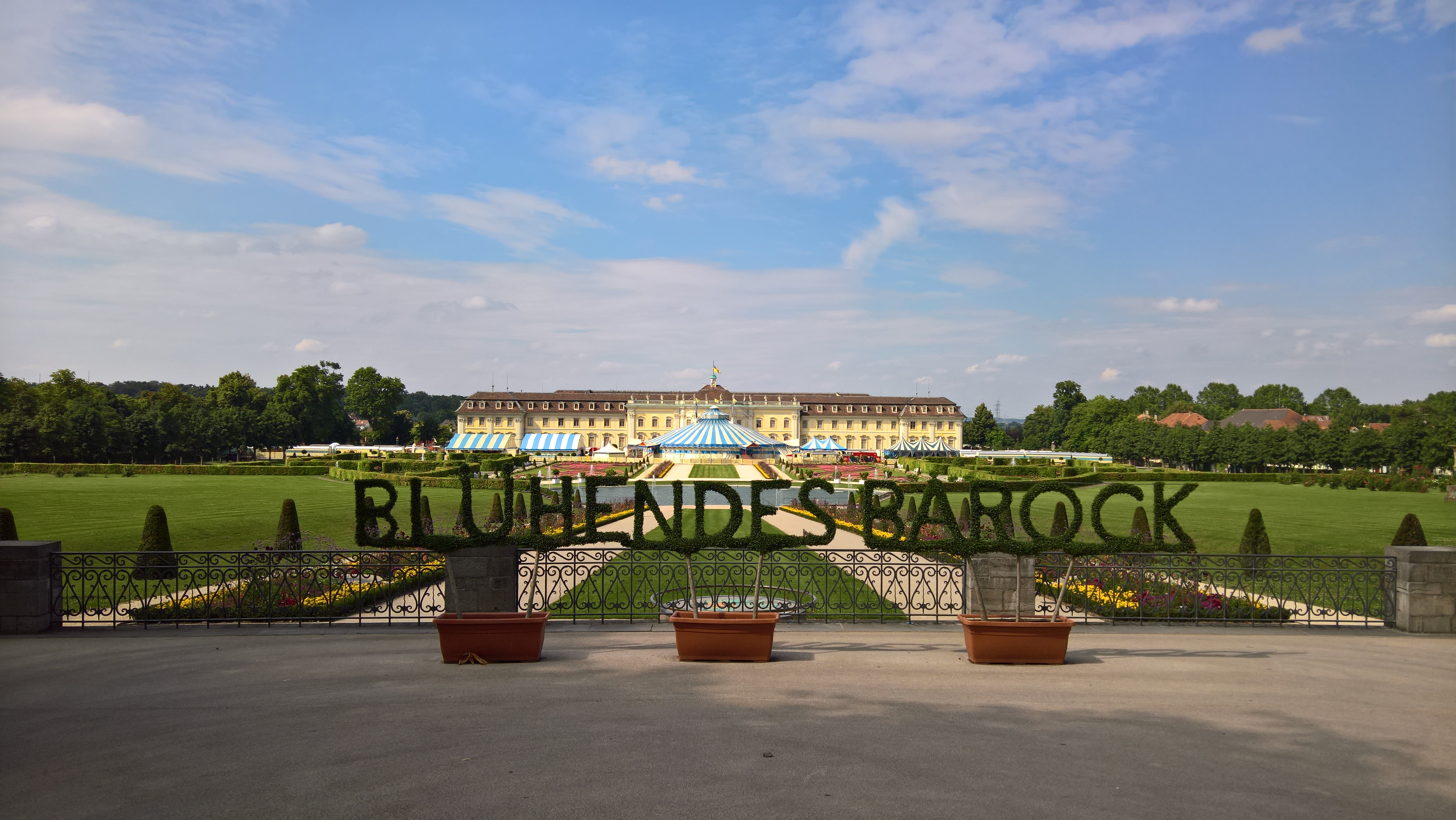
The Blooming Baroque gardens around Ludwigsburg Palace

In 1947, Albert Schöchle, Director of the State Parks and Gardens Authority, was charged with maintaining the gardens. After visiting the 1951 Bundesgartenschau in Hanover, he decided to restore the gardens. Schöchle convinced Baden-Württemberg's Minister of Finance Karl Frank to help fund the venture in 1952 on the condition that the town of Ludwigsburg also assisted. Ludwigsburg's mayor, Elmar Doch, and the town council agreed to this stipulation. Frank approved the start of work on 23 March 1953, but it lasted late into the year. The restoration of the garden required the moving of 100,000 cubic meters (3,531,467 cu ft) of earth by bulldozers supplied and operated by American soldiers and the planting of tens of thousands of trees and hedges, 22,000 roses, and 400,000 other flowers. The Blooming Baroque (Blühendes Barock) gardens were opened on 23 April 1954 as a special horticultural show and attracted more than 500,000 visitors by the end of May, among them President Theodor Heuss. When the show closed in the fall of 1954, it had recouped all but 150,000 Deutsche Marks of the investment in the restoration of the gardens and became a permanent landmark. The opening of the Fairy-Tale Garden and its recreations of fairy-tales in 1959 was also an immediate success and increased revenue by 50% for that year. The Blooming Baroque gardens, covering an area of 32 hectares (79 acres), attract 520,000 to 550,000 visitors annually.

Map of the palatial grounds
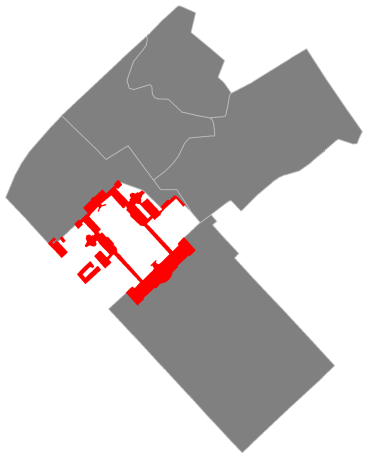
Palace

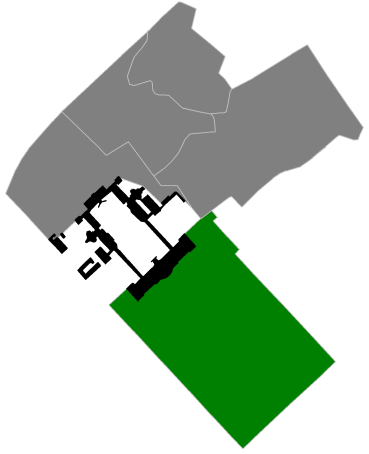
South garden

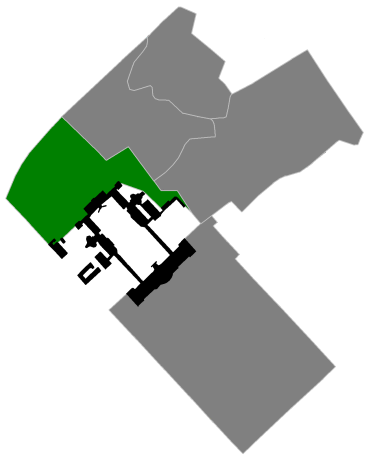
North garden

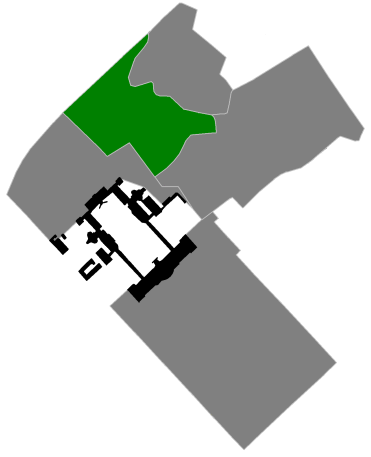
Lower east garden

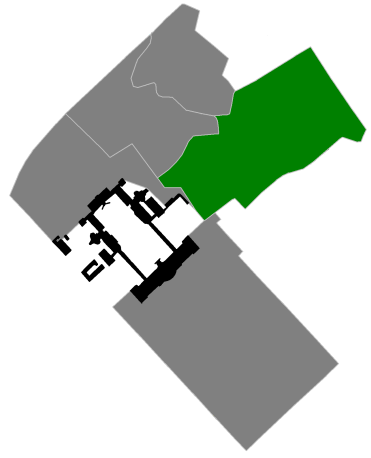
Upper east garden

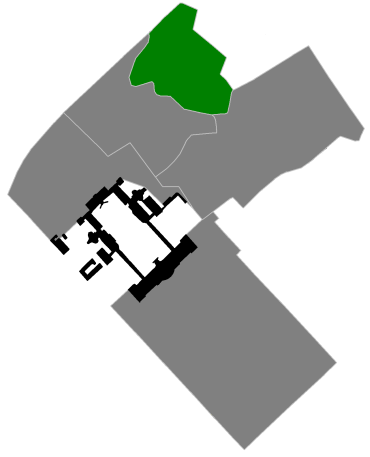
Fairy-tale garden

=== Schloss Favorite ===
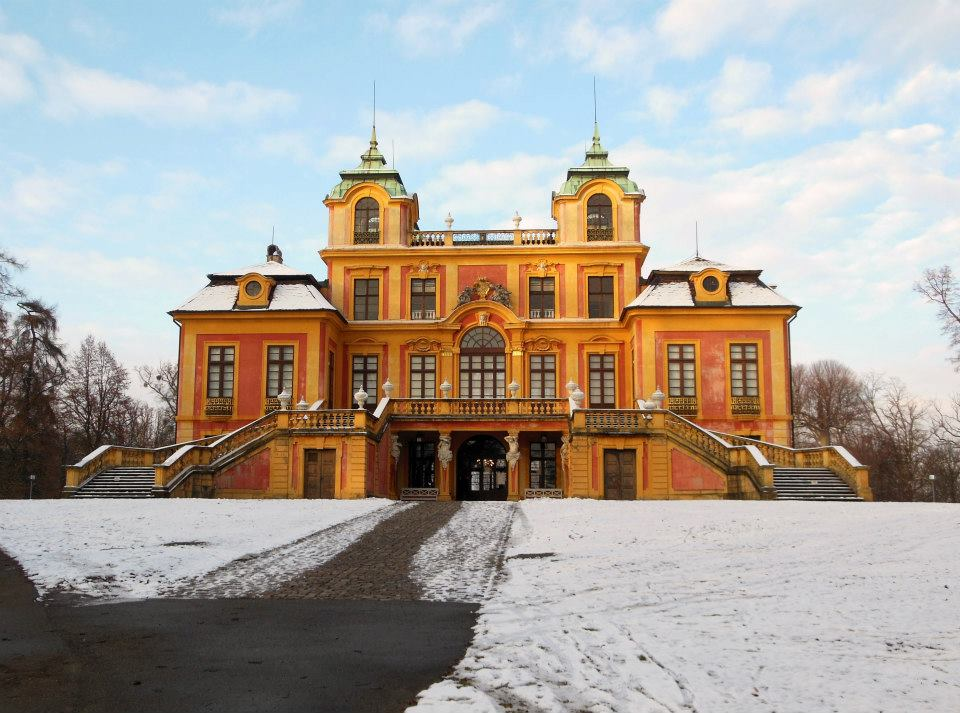
Schloss Favorite in the winter

By 1710 Eberhard Louis had decided to use Ludwigsburg as his main residence, but he still desired a hunting retreat. Inspired by a garden palace he had seen in Vienna, he tasked Frisoni with the design of a new Rococo palace on a hill to the north of Ludwigsburg. Frisoni largely completed Favorite within that year but was unable to complete his extensive plans for its grounds. Only the roads to the main palace and to Monrepos Palace were laid out. In 1800, the interior was remodeled by Thouret for Frederick I. Only one room, in the western half of the building, retains its original baroque appearance. When Frederick was appointed an elector in 1803 and then a king in 1806, he chose both times to celebrate the occasion at Schloss Favorite. Favorite fell into disrepair in the 20th century but was extensively restored from 1972 to 1982.

=== Museums ===
On the first and third floors of the Alter Hauptbau is the Baroque Gallery (Barockgalerie), a subsidiary museum of the Staatsgalerie Stuttgart opened in 2004. It displays 120 paintings, some of which are originals from a purchase Duke Charles Alexander made in 1736 of about 400 paintings from Gustav Adolf von Gotter. Examples of German and Italian Baroque paintings on display include Martin van Meytens's portrait of Charles Alexander, works by Johann Heinrich Schönfeld, Carl Borromäus Andreas Ruthart, Johann Heiss, and Katharina Treu, as well as works that formerly were in the collection of Cosimo III, Grand Duke of Tuscany.

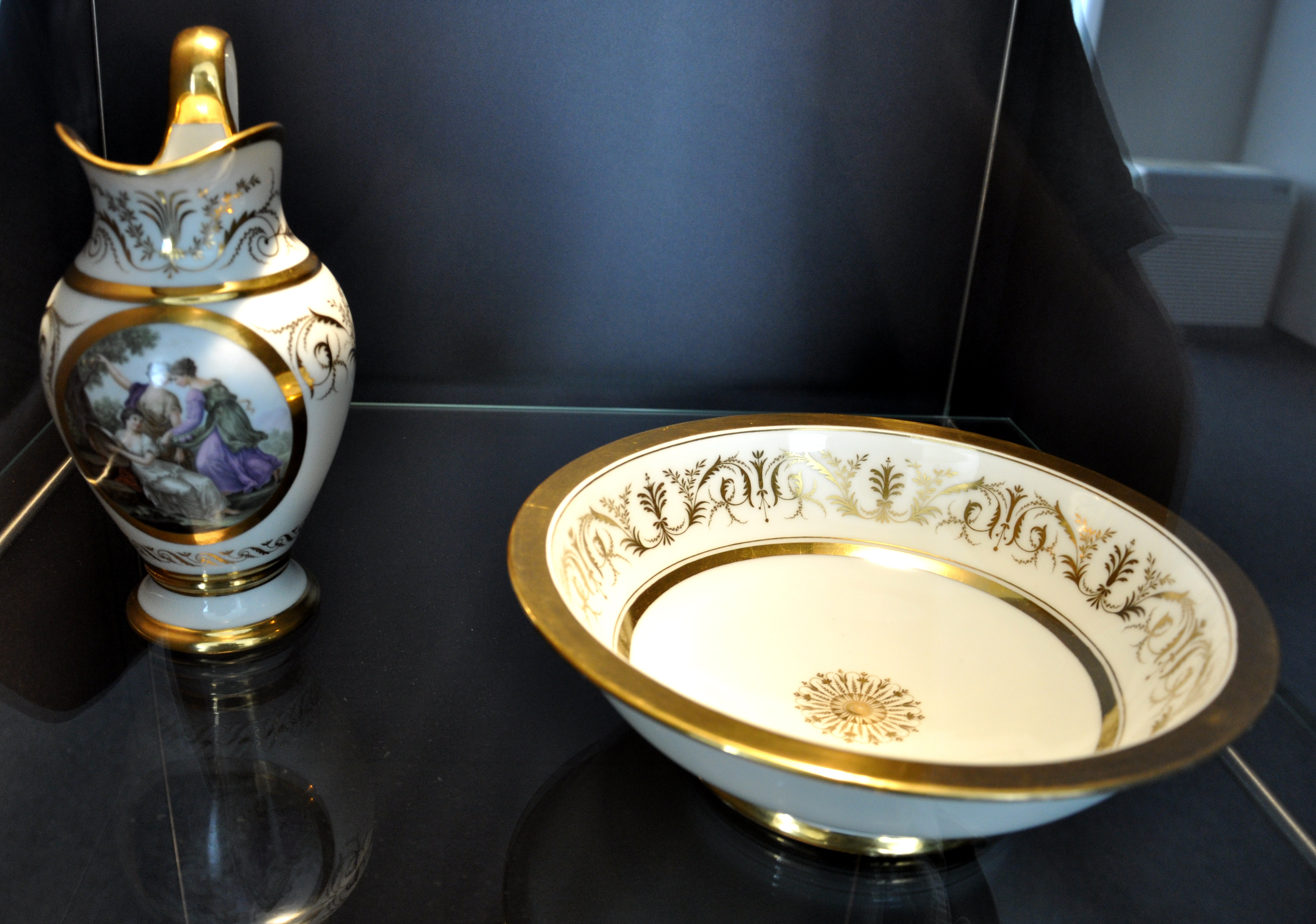
Ludwigsburg porcelain on display in the Ceramics Museum

The Landesmuseum Württemberg maintains two subsidiary museums at Ludwigsburg Palace, the Ceramics Museum and Fashion Museum (Keramikmuseum and Modemuseum, respectively), both opened in 2004. The first of these takes up all of the third floor of the Neuer Hauptbau except the apartment of Duke Charles Eugene, a space of 2,000 square meters (22,000 ft^{2}) containing more than 4,500 exhibits of porcelain, ceramics, faience and pottery, and of their history, making it one of the largest collections of ceramics in Europe. It includes 2,000 pieces of original Ludwigsburg porcelain and 800 pieces of maiolica, purchased by Charles Eugene from dealers in Augsburg and Nuremberg. It also includes porcelain from the manufactories at Meissen, Berlin, Sèvres, and Vienna, and 20th century Art Nouveau pieces purchased from six countries since 1950. The Fashion Museum, housed in the Festinbau and West Kavalierbau, displays about 700 pieces of clothing and accessories from the 1750s to the 1960s, including works by Charles Frederick Worth, Paul Poiret, Christian Dior, and Issey Miyake.

On the ground floor of the Neuer Hauptbau is a lapidarium, housing original Baroque statuary by Andreas Quittainer, Johann Wilhelm Beyer and Pierre François Lejeune. Charles Eugene's apartment houses the Princess Olga Cabinet Exhibition, exploring the lives of Princess Olga and her family at Ludwigsburg from 1901 to 1932.

Kinderreich (Children's Kingdom) is an interactive museum that educates children four years and older about life at the court of the Duke of Württemberg. In the Palace Theatre, about 140 original set pieces and props from the 18th and 19th centuries are preserved that were discovered during restoration of the theatre, such as oil lamps used for stage lighting. These items were extensively restored to their original condition from 1987 to 1995, and since 1995 one of the original stage pieces, a winter background, has been used for the Junge Bühne (Young stage).

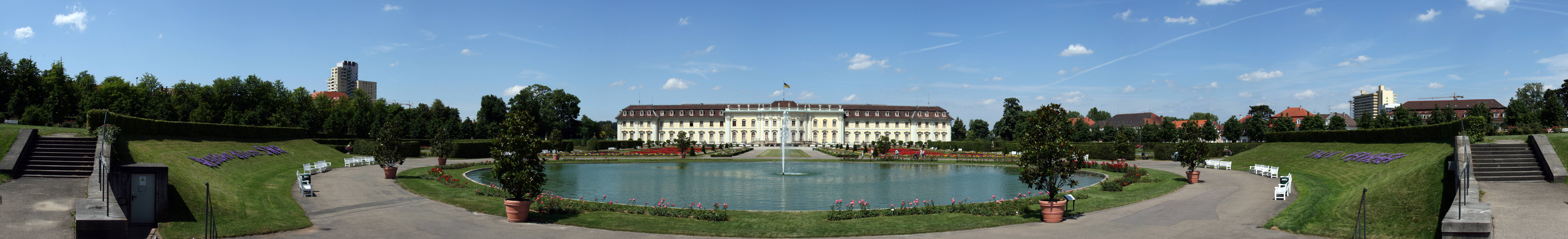
Panorama of the Neuer Hauptbau, looking north

== See also ==
- 18th-century Western domes
- List of Baroque residences
- Würzburg Residence
