= Giovanni Battista Innocenzo Colombo =

Giovanni Battista Innocenzo Colomba
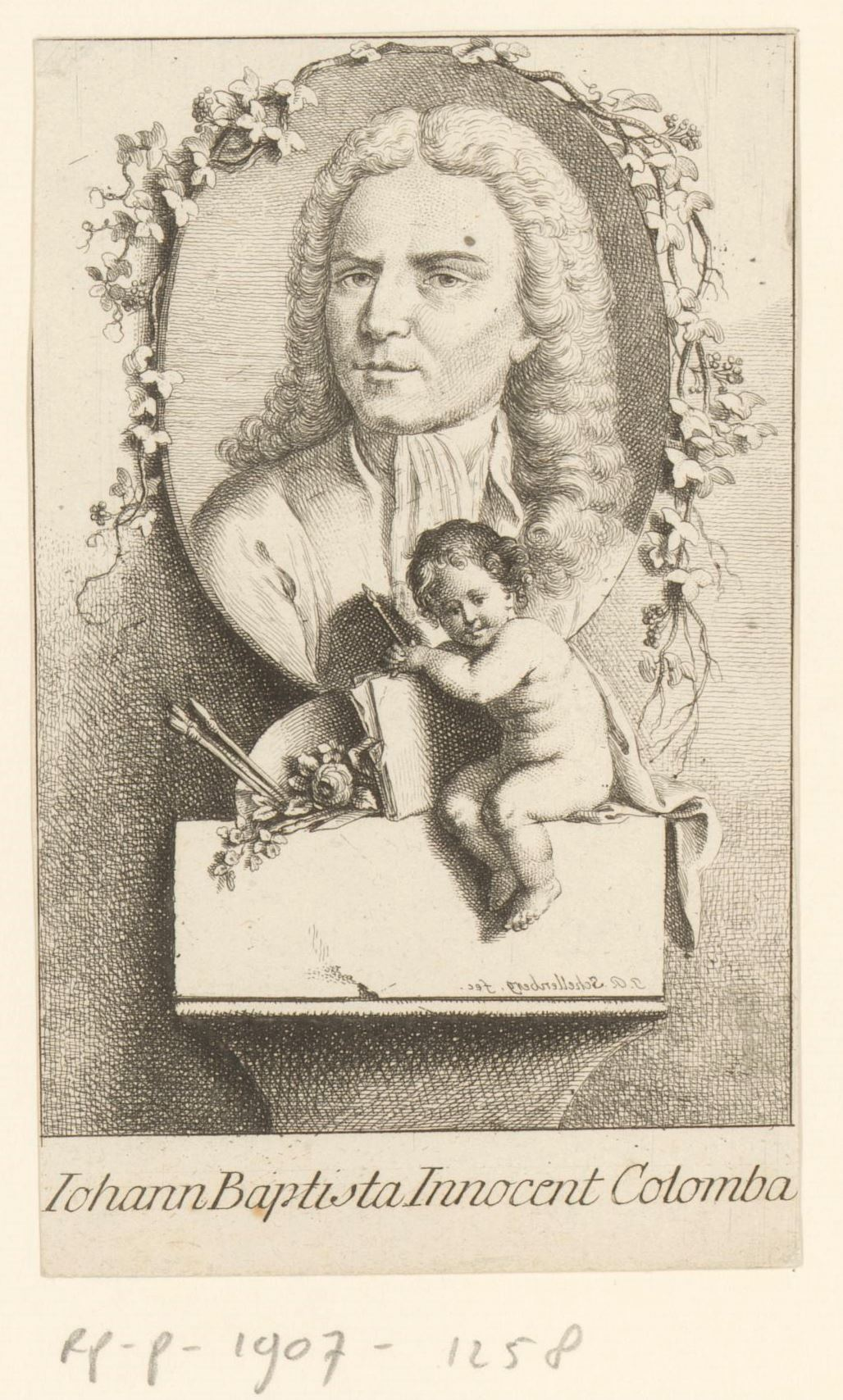
- Born: 16 December 1717; Arogno, Switzerland
- Died: 10 April 1801 (aged 83); Arogno
- Notable work: Opera design

Giovanni Battista Innocenzo Colombo (16 December 1717 – 10 April 1801) was a Swiss painter and stage set designer.

Born in Arogno, he was a pupil of his uncle, Luca Antonio Colomba. He worked in Frankfurt, Mannheim, Vienna, Hamburg, Prague, Munich and other cities. For 18 years, he was the court architect at Stuttgart and stage set designer for the Duke. He also worked in Turin, but his major work was a large ceiling fresco at the Ludwigsburg Palace.

His first documented paintings were for allegorical decorations and quadratura for the ceiling of the Römer at Frankfurt. This work was destroyed in World War II. In 1749, he was commissioned to decorate a parochial church at Uetersen in Schleswig-Holstein. In 1750, he decorated the ducal theatre at Hannover. From 1751 to 1768, he was the court painter for the Duke of Württemberg, Charles Eugene, Duke of Württemberg, who founded the Academy of Art of Stuttgart. In Stuttgart, he created the set designs for operas of Niccolò Jommelli, and the ballets of Jean-Georges Noverre.

From 1769 to 1771, he was the stage set designer for the Teatro Regio, substituting for the members of the Galliari family. An example of work in that theatre is his sets for the 1770 opera Annibale a Torino, written by Jacopo Durandi, with music by Giovanni Paisiello. This opera was admired by Mozart and his father on 16 January 1771.

From 1774 to 1780, he painted sets for Her Majesty's Theatre. He participated in an exhibition at the Royal Academy of Arts in 1774. In 1780, he returned to Arogno. He also painted small canvases depicting scenes of plays, with attention to the landscape.
