= Giovanni Battista Colomba =

Italian painter

Giovanni Battista Colomba (born 1638) was an Italian painter and architect of the Baroque period. He was born in Arogno in the Ticino, and was active there including in the monastery of San Floriano. He died poor in the service of the King of Poland. He was the uncle of Giovanni Battista Innocenzo Colombo.

== Sources ==
- Boni, Filippo de' (1852). Biografia degli artisti ovvero dizionario della vita e delle opere dei pittori, degli scultori, degli intagliatori, dei tipografi e dei musici di ogni nazione che fiorirono da'tempi più remoti sino á nostri giorni. Seconda Edizione. Venice; Googlebooks: Presso Andrea Santini e Figlio. p. 238.
