= Carlo Carlone =

Italian painter

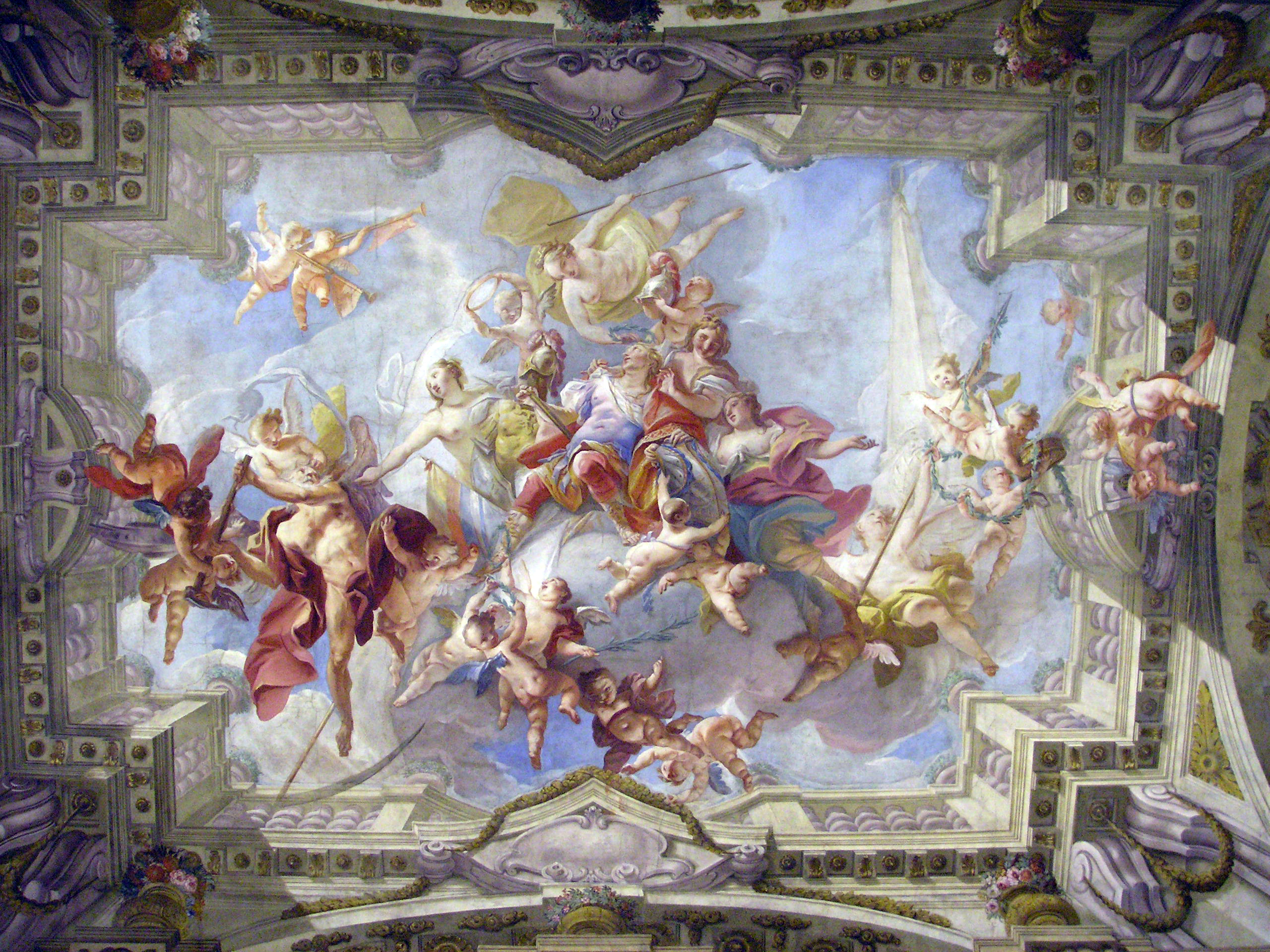
Ceiling of the Grand staircase of the Palais Kinsky in Vienna

Carlo Innocenzo Carlone or Carloni (1686–1775) was an Italian painter and engraver, active especially in the Holy Roman Empire.

== Biography ==
He was a native of Scaria, near Como, in Lombardy, but may have been from the Carloni family of Genoese painters. He was the son of a sculptor, but he preferred painting, and was placed under the care of Giulio Quaglio. He subsequently trained also with Giovanni Battista Colomba. He afterwards studied at Venice and at Rome, with Francesco Trevisani until he was 23 years of age, when he visited Germany, where he has left works in oil and in fresco at Ludwigsburg, Passau, Linz, Breslau, Prague, and Vienna.

He painted large decorative fresco cycles for palaces in Vienna, Prague and Southern Germany. For example, Carlone is known for painting the ceiling images in the Upper Belvedere of the Belvedere palace complex. His The Glorification of Saints Felix and Adauctus (1759–1761) was commissioned for the cupola of the church of San Felice del Benaco on Lake Garda. He died at Como.

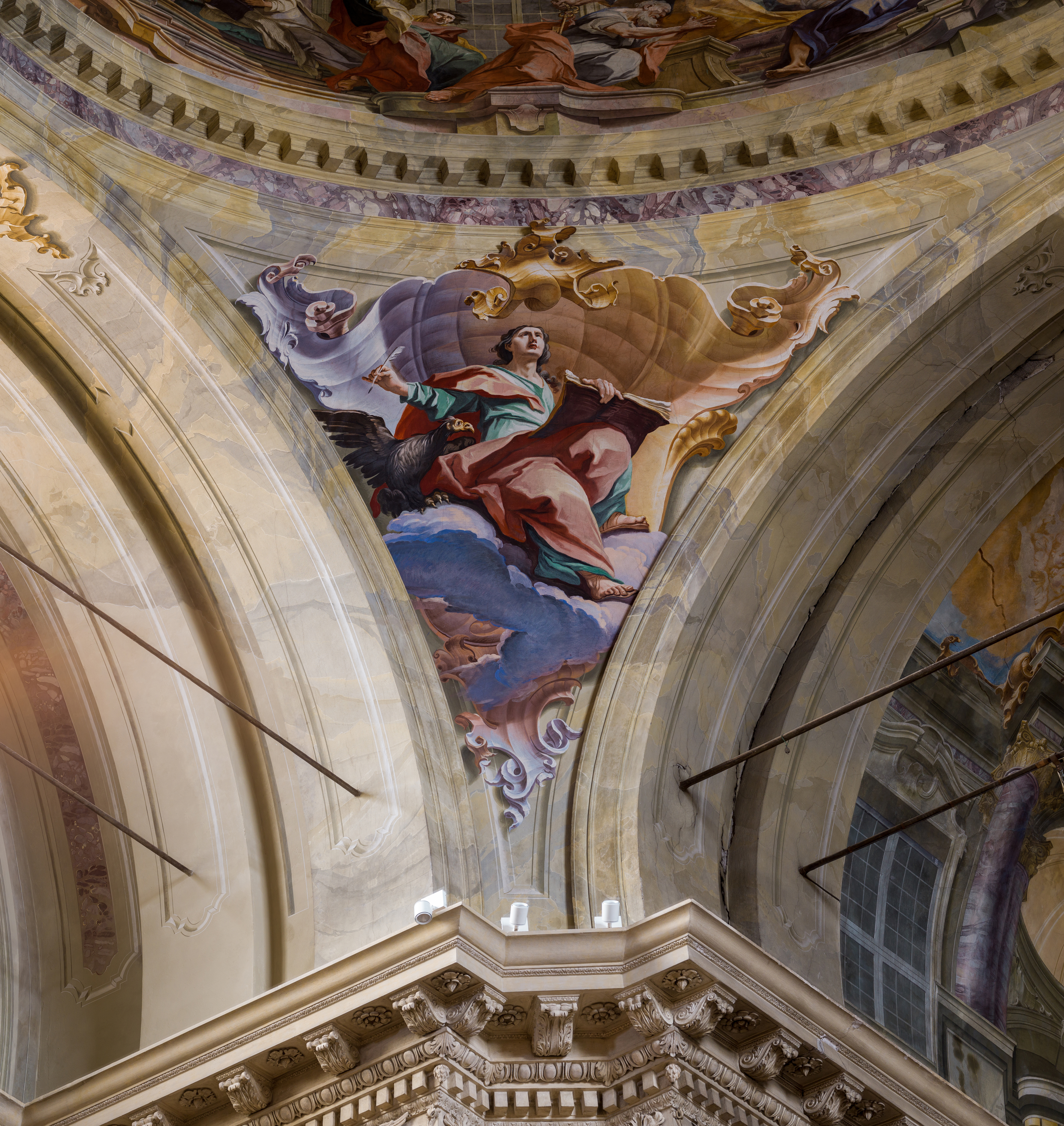
Saint John Evangelist by Carlo Innocenzo Carloni in the Chiesa di Sant'Afra church in Brescia

== Works ==
As an engraver he has left the following plates, mostly from his own compositions:

- Conception of the Virgin.
- The Holy Family, with St. John kissing the Foot of Jesus.
- St Charles Borromeo meeting the Plague-stricken.
- The Death of a Saint.
- Allegorical subject of Opulence, for a ceiling.
- Figure with a Crown, another subject for a ceiling.
- Group of Children with a Basket of Flowers.

== See also ==
- Hofburg – winter residence of the Austrian royal family.
- Gaifami Palace

== Sources ==
- Bryan, Michael (1886). Robert Edmund Graves (ed.). Dictionary of Painters and Engravers, Biographical and Critical. Vol. I: A–K. London: George Bell and Sons. pp. 233–234.
