= Donato Giuseppe Frisoni =

Italian architect

- Born: 1681 or 1683; Laino, Duchy of Milan
- Died: November 29, 1735 (aged 54, 53, or 52); Ludwigsburg, Duchy of Württemberg
- Occupation: Architect
- Known for: Ludwigsburg Palace, Schloss Favorite (Ludwigsburg)

Donato Giuseppe Frisoni (b. 1681 or 1683, Laino – d. 29 November 1735, Ludwigsburg) was an Italian architect active during the Rococo period in Northern Italy, Southern Germany, and Bohemia.

== Biography ==
Donato Giuseppe Frisoni was born in Laino, a village in the Val d'Intelvi, in what was then the Duchy of Milan. (Note: The Val d'Intelvi, in the Province of Como, was the origin of famed Baroque artisans Giovanni Battista Alliprandi, Giacomo Antonio Corbellini, the Rettis (Leopoldo, Paolo, Riccardo, Livio), and Giovanni Pietro Scotti.)

Frisoni traveled to and worked in Vienna under Santino Bussi, who had been at work in the Austrian capital since 1695. After 1700, Frisoni traveled to Prague to work with his brother-in-law Tomasso Soldati under Giovanni Battista Alliprandi. In 1708, Frisoni and Soldatti were recruited by Johann Friedrich Nette, court architect in the Duchy of Württemberg, to work as a stuccoist at Ludwigsburg Palace. Frisoni and Soldati began working at Ludwigsburg with in the interiors of its Old Main Building in 1709. Over the winter of 1709, Frisoni returned to Laino and married Anna Maria Allio. Their marriage would produce two children.
