= Johann Friedrich Nette =

German architect

- Born: 5 July 1673; Bernau bei Berlin
- Died: 9 December 1714 (aged 41); Nancy, Duchy of Lorraine
- Occupation: Architect
- Known for: Ludwigsburg Palace

Johann Friedrich Nette (5 July 1673 — 9 December 1714) was a German architect of the Baroque epoch, trained in the Bohemian style. From 1707 until his death, Nette was the court architect for the Duchy of Württemberg.

== Early life ==
Johann Friedrich Nette was born on 5 July 1673 in Bernau bei Berlin, the son of the Prussian court organ builder, also named Johann Nette. From 1685 to 1700, the Nettes lived in Dresden, where Johann Friedrich attended the Kreuzschule and then the University of Wittenberg until 1695. After that point, little is known about Nette's life until the War of the Spanish Succession.

== Career ==
In 1706, Nette, at the time an engineer captain, was stationed at Balingen under the command of a Major General Sternberg. Sternberg recommended Nette to his brother-in-law Georg Friedrich von Forstner, who happened to be a friend of and Hofmarschall to Eberhard Louis, Duke of Württemberg. Nette replaced the incumbent court architect Philipp Joseph Jenisch in 1707, and with that appointment was charged with the design and construction of a retreat for the Duke north of Stuttgart. Nette began work on this residence, Ludwigsburg Palace, in 1707, though it was slow thanks to the still-ongoing War of the Spanish Succession. In 1709, the Duke instructed Nette to attach two wings to the existing structure to create a three-wing palace. Despite the war, Nette traveled to Prague in 1708 and 1709 to study Bohemian Baroque architecture and recruit artisans for Ludwigsburg.

On 9 December 1714, Nette died suddenly of a stroke near Nancy, in the Duchy of Lorraine.
