= Timeline of Stuttgart =

The following is a timeline of the history of the city of Stuttgart, Germany.

== Prior to 14th century ==
- 1st C. CE - Roman fort established (Bad Cannstatt).
- 950 CE - Old Castle built.
- 1240 - Stiftskirche built.
- 1300 - Counts of Württemberg establish residence (approximate date).

== 14th-18th century ==
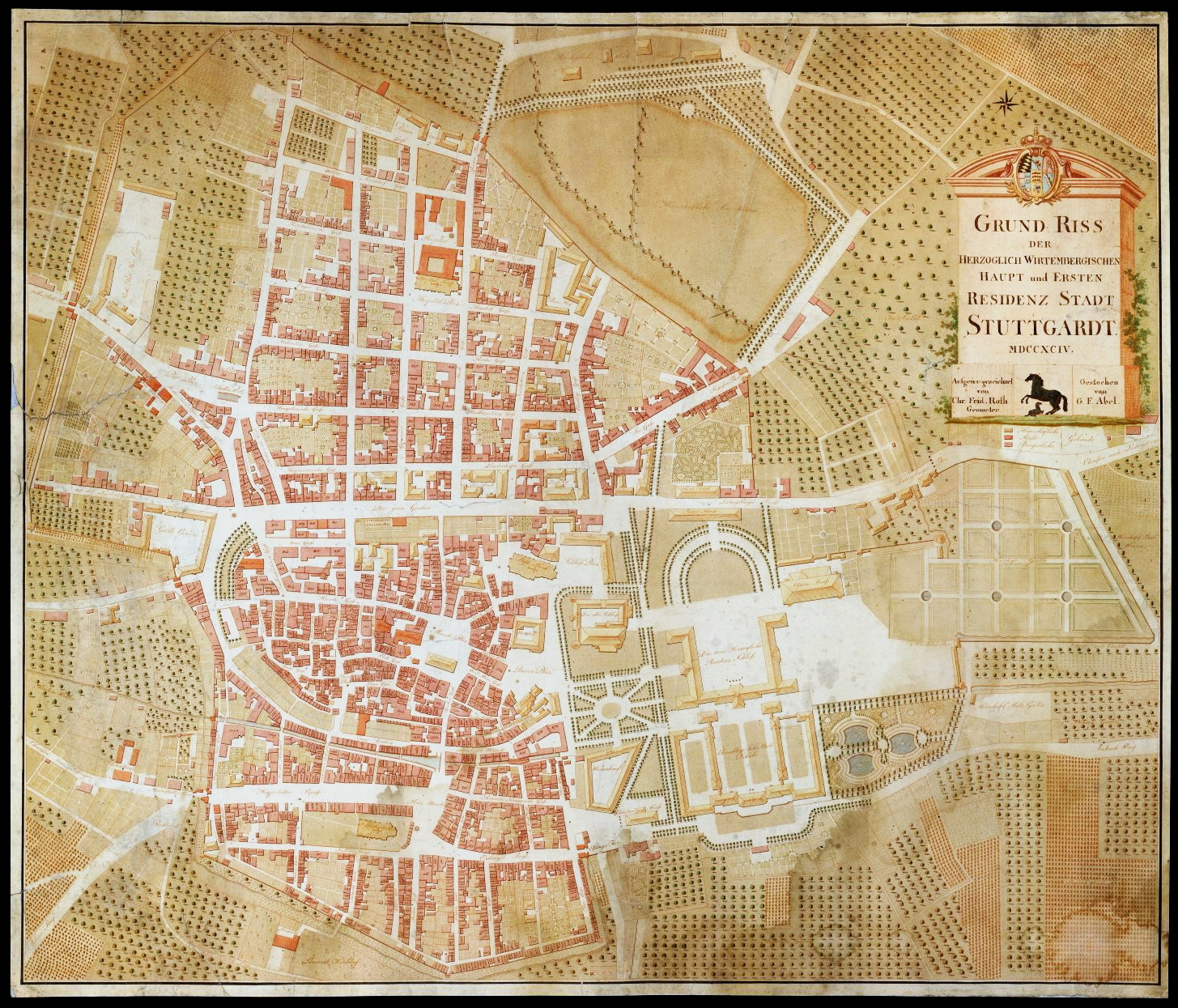
Map of Stuttgart, 1794

- 1321 - City status granted.
- 1392 - Eberhard II, Count of Württemberg (1315–1392) dies in Stuttgart.
- 1486 - Printing press in operation.
- 1493 - Spitalkirche built.
- 1495 - Stuttgart becomes capital of Wurttemberg.
- 1570 - Old Palace built.
- 1626 - Hoppenlaufriedhof (cemetery) in use.
- 1686 - Gymnasium illustre (school) established.
- 1769 - Castle Solitude built outside city.
- 1775 - Karlsschule relocates to Stuttgart.
- 1795 - Population: 19,510.

== 19th century ==
- 1803 - City becomes capital of the Electorate of Württemberg.
- 1807
  - New Palace built.
  - Schlossplatz opens.
- 1808 - Schloss-Garten laid out in Neckar-Strasse.
- 1810 - Royal Library founded by Frederick I of Württemberg.
- 1811 - Stuttgart Cathedral rebuilding completed.
- 1820 - Willibald Feuerlein becomes mayor.
- 1824 - Stuttgarter Liederkranz (singing society) founded.
- 1826 - Natural history museum opens.
- 1827 - Katharinenhospital Stuttgart built.
- 1829 - University of Stuttgart founded.
- 1830 - Rosenstein Palace completed.
- 1832 - Winterschule für Bauhandwerker (trade school) founded.
- 1833 - Georg Gottlob von Gutbrod becomes mayor.
- 1839 - Schiller memorial erected in Schillerplatz.
- 1840 - Wilhelm Palais built.
- 1841
  - Schlossplatz column erected.
  - Hospitalkirche restored.
  - Population: 42,217.
- 1842 - Olgahospital founded.
- 1843 - Staatsgalerie Stuttgart (art museum) opens.
- 1846
  - Railway station opens.
  - Wilhelma garden established.
- 1848 - Stuttgart-Heilbronn railway begins operating.
- 1849 - Rump parliament held.
- 1857
  - Stuttgart Music School founded.
  - Hotel Marquardt in business.
  - Ploucquet's Museum opens.
- 1860
  - Königsbau constructed on the Schlossplatz.
  - Population: 61,314.
- 1861 - Stuttgart Synagogue built.
- 1862 - Heinrich von Sick becomes mayor.
- 1864 - Kultur- und Kongresszentrum Liederhalle (concert hall) built.
- 1865 - Polytechnic School built in Stadtgarten-Platz.
- 1869 - Württemberg State Museum founded.
- 1870 - Architectural school built.
- 1871
  - City becomes part of the German Empire.
  - Tiergarten Nill zoo in business.
- 1872
  - Black Forest Railway (Württemberg) in operation.
  - Theophil Friedrich von Hack becomes mayor.
  - Stuttgarter Hofbräu brewery in business.
- 1873 - Pragfriedhof (cemetery) established.
- 1875
  - Martin's "Museum of the Primeval World" opens.
  - Marienkirche built.
- 1876 - Johanneskirche built.
- 1880
  - Wilhelma park opens to the public.
  - Law Courts built.
  - Population: 117,303.
- 1881 - Breuninger retailer in business.
  - Gewerbehalle built in Kriegsberg-Strasse.
- 1888 - Dinkelacker brewery in business.
- 1889 - Stuttgart Swimming Baths built.
- 1890 - Population: 139,817.
- 1892 - Socialist women's newspaper Die Gleichheit in publication in Stuttgart.
- 1893 - Emil von Rümelin becomes mayor.
- 1894 - Hotel Victoria (Stuttgart) in business.
- 1895 - Kriegsberg Tower, Landesgewerbe-Museum (industrial museum), and Königin-Olga-Bau constructed.
- 1899 - Heinrich von Gauss becomes mayor.
- 1900
  - German Peace Society headquartered in city.
  - Friedrichsbau theatre opens.
  - Stuttgarter Hymnus-Chorknaben (boys' choir) founded.
  - Population: 176,699.

== 20th century ==
=== 1900s-1945 ===
- 1901 - City public library established.
- 1903 - Solituderennen motorsport events begin.
- 1905
  - Cannstatt and Untertürkheim become part of city.
  - Population:249,443.
- 1907 - International Socialist Congress held in Stuttgart.
- 1908
  - Degerloch becomes part of city.
  - Cavalry barracks built.
- 1910
  - Markthalle Stuttgart built.
  - Population: 286,218.
- 1911
  - Linden Museum established.
  - Karl Lautenschlager becomes mayor.
- 1912
  - Verein für Bewegungsspiele Stuttgart (football club) formed.
  - Königliche Hoftheater and Stuttgart-Degerloch water tower built.
- 1913 - Waldfriedhof Stuttgart (cemetery) established.
- 1915 - Böblingen Airport begins operating.
- 1916 - Stuttgart Open tennis tournament begins.
- 1918
  - City becomes capital of Free People's State of Württemberg.
  - Schlossplatz opens to the public.
- 1919 - Population: 309,197.
- 1922
  - Botnang becomes part of city.
  - Stuttgart Central Station rebuilt.
  - Stuttgart Observatory active.
- 1924 - Stuttgarter Philharmoniker (orchestra) formed.
- 1927
  - Weissenhof Estate built.
  - Flandern military training ground active.
- 1928 - Tagblatt-Turm and Schocken Department Store built.
- 1931
  - Rotenberg and Zuffenhausen become part of city.
  - Ferdinand Porsche in business.
- 1933
  - Feuerbach and Weilimdorf become part of city.
  - Karl Strölin becomes mayor.
  - Adolf-Hitler-Kampfbahn (stadium) built.
- 1935 - Max-Eyth-See (artificial lake) created.
- 1937 - Kurmärker Kaserne (military barracks) built.
- 1938
  - Helenen Kaserne (military barracks) established.
  - Coat of arms of Stuttgart redesign adopted.
- 1939
  - Stuttgart Airport built.
  - Horticultural exhibition held in Killesbergpark.
  - Deportation of Jews begins.
- 1940
  - Robert-Bosch-Hospital opens.
  - August 25: Aerial bombing by Allied forces begins.
- 1942
  - Plieningen and Stammheim (Stuttgart) become part of city.
  - November 22: Aerial bombing.
- 1943
  - March 11: Aerial bombing.
  - April 15: Aerial bombing.
  - September 6: Aerial bombing.
  - October 8: Aerial bombing.
  - November 26: Aerial bombing.
- 1944
  - February 21: Aerial bombing.
  - March 2: Aerial bombing.
  - March 15: Aerial bombing.
  - July: Aerial bombing.
  - September: Aerial bombing.
  - October 19: Aerial bombing.
  - November 5: Aerial bombing.
  - December 9: Aerial bombing.
- 1945
  - January 28: Aerial bombing.
  - April 21: Allied ground forces take city; military occupation begins.
  - December 5: United States Army occupies Kelley Barracks.
  - Stuttgart Radio Symphony Orchestra and Volkstheater founded.
  - Arnulf Klett becomes mayor.

=== 1946-1990s ===
- 1946 - Südfunk-Chor Stuttgart (choir) formed.
- 1947 - Alte Staatsgalerie rebuilt.
- 1948 - Bölkow aircraft manufactory in business.
- 1952 - City becomes part of newly formed state of Baden-Württemberg.
- 1953 - Landesarboretum Baden-Württemberg established.
- 1954
  - Bodensee-Wasserversorgung (water supply organization) founded.
  - State Museum of Natural History exhibits open in Rosenstein Castle.
- 1956 - Fernsehturm Stuttgart commissioned.
- 1957 - Birkenkopf enlarged.
- 1961 - City hosts Bundesgartenschau (national horticulture biennial).
- 1964
  - Stammheim Prison commissioned.
  - New Palace reconstructed.
- 1965
  - Wilhelm Palais reconstructed.
  - Railway Vehicle Preservation Company founded.
- 1966 - Funkturm Stuttgart and Versatel building constructed.
- 1967 - United States European Command headquarters relocates to Stuttgart.
- 1969 - Old Castle renovated.
- 1970 - Württembergische Landesbibliothek (state library) building opens.
- 1971 - Georg von Holtzbrinck Publishing Group in business.
- 1972 - Hannibal housing development and Fernmeldeturm constructed.
- 1973 - Stuttgart (region) (Regierungsbezirk) established.
- 1974 - Manfred Rommel becomes mayor.
- 1975
  - Trial of Red Army Faction members held in Stammheim Prison.
  - Stuttgart-Möhringen directional radio tower built.
- 1976
  - Porsche Museum opens.
  - Kickers-Stadium renovated.
- 1978
  - Stuttgart S-Bahn begins operating.
  - Künstlerhaus Stuttgart founded.
  - Roman Catholic Diocese of Rottenburg-Stuttgart active.
- 1981 - Internationale Bachakademie Stuttgart founded.
- 1982 - Trickfilmfestival Stuttgart begins.
- 1983 - Hanns-Martin-Schleyer-Halle built.
- 1984
  - Neue Staatsgalerie (art museum) opens.
  - Theaterhaus Stuttgart founded.
- 1987 - Sparkassen Cup track and field competition begins.
- 1988
  - Schwanenbrau Cup cycling race begins.
  - May: 1988 European Cup Final held.
- 1994 - Stuttgart Region (metropolitan area) and Regionalversammlung des Verbands Region Stuttgart (regional governance entity) established.
- 1997 - Wolfgang Schuster becomes mayor.
- 2000 - Observation tower built in Killesbergpark.

== 21st century ==
- 2005 - Kunstmuseum Stuttgart opens.
- 2006 - Mercedes-Benz Museum opens.
- 2007
  - Messe Stuttgart (exhibition centre) built.
  - United States Africa Command headquartered in Stuttgart.
- 2011
  - May: Trial of Rwandan military leader Ignace Murwanashyaka begins at the Oberlandesgericht Stuttgart.
  - Population: 613,392.
- 2013 - Fritz Kuhn becomes mayor.

== See also ==
- Stuttgart history
- List of districts of Stuttgart
- List of mayors of Stuttgart

Other cities in the state of Baden-Württemberg:^{(de)}

- Timeline of Mannheim

== Bibliography ==
=== in English ===
- "Stuttgart", Guide through Germany, Austria-Hungary, Switzerland, Italy, France, Belgium, Holland, the United Kingdom, Spain, Portugal, &c (9th ed.), Berlin: J.H. Herz, 1908, OCLC 36795367
- "Stuttgart" . Encyclopædia Britannica. Vol. 25 (11th ed.). 1910. pp. 1054–1055.
- Nathaniel Newnham Davis (1911), "Stuttgart", The Gourmet's Guide to Europe (3rd ed.), London: Grant Richards
- "Stuttgart", Southern Germany (Wurtemberg and Bavaria) (12th ed.), Leipzig: K. Baedeker, 1914, OCLC 2011248
- John M. Jeep, ed. (2001). "Stuttgart". Medieval Germany: an Encyclopedia. Garland Publishing. ISBN 0-8240-7644-3.

=== in German ===
- Wilhelm Heinrich Theodor Plieninger (1834). Beschreibung von Stuttgart (in German). Stuttgart: Hoffmann.
- August Zoller (1841). Stuttgart und seine Umgebungen (in German). Stuttgart: F.H. Kohler.
- Julius Hartmann (1886). Chronik der Stadt Stuttgart (in German). Stuttgart: Greiner & Pfeiffer.
- "Stuttgart". Brockhaus' Konversations-Lexikon (in German) (14th ed.). Leipzig: Brockhaus. 1896. hdl:2027/njp.32101064064528.
- P. Krauss und E. Uetrecht, ed. (1913). "Stuttgart". Meyers Deutscher Städteatlas [Meyer's Atlas of German Cities] (in German). Leipzig: Bibliographisches Institut.
- Stuttgart [Chronicles of the German Cities]. Die Chroniken der Deutschen Städte (in German). Vol. 33–36. Leipzig: S. Hirzel. 1928–1931.
- Wolfgang Adam; Siegrid Westphal, eds. (2012). "Stuttgart". Handbuch kultureller Zentren der Frühen Neuzeit: Städte und Residenzen im alten deutschen Sprachraum (in German). De Gruyter. pp. 1877+. ISBN 978-3-11-029555-9.
- Uwe Bogen; Thomas Wagner (2012). Stuttgart: Eine Stadt verändert ihr Gesicht (in German). Sutton Verlag.
