= Filder =

Natural region in Germany

Coordinates: 48.7000°N 9.2635°E

Location of the Filder in Baden-Württemberg

The Filder (German pronunciation: [ˈfɪldɐ]; plural) – also Filder Plain (German: Filderebene) – is a natural region (major unit no. 106) of the Swabian Keuper-Lias Land within the South German Scarplands.

They form a gently rolling, fertile plateau in the German state of Baden-Württemberg, which extends over the western half of the county of Esslingen and the southern part of the borough of the state capital of Stuttgart. Geologically it was formed by the transformation of a fault zone from the Lias period.

== Hills ==
Among the hills of the Filder are the:

- Bernhartshöhe (549 m above NN), near Vaihingen by the 4-way motorway intersection, the highest point in the borough of Stuttgart
- Bopser (485.2 m above NN), here is the Stuttgart TV Tower and the Waldau Sports Centre (Sportzentrum Waldau) (including the Gazi-Stadion auf der Waldau, home ground of Stuttgarter Kickers football team)

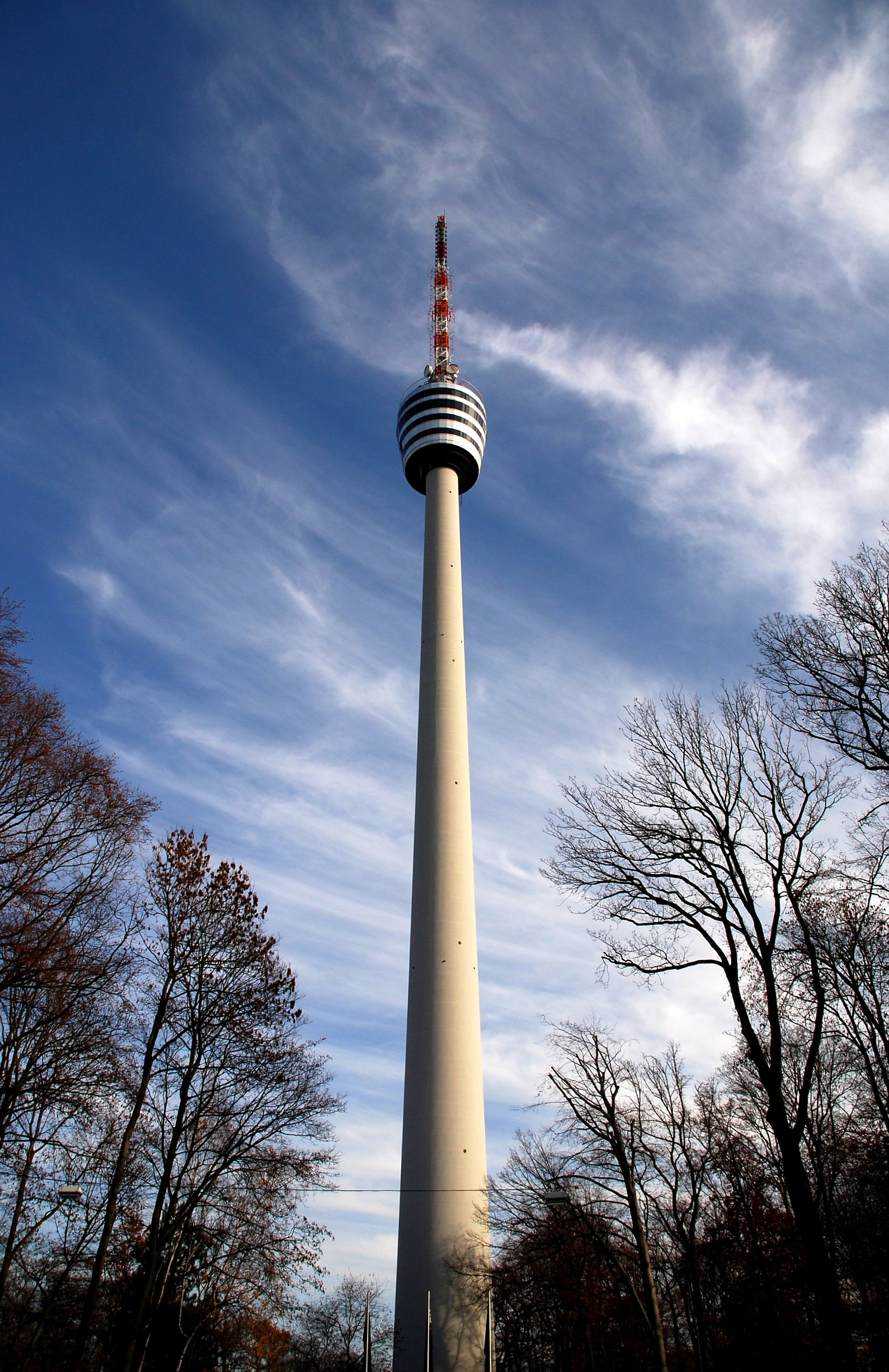
The Stuttgart TV Tower on the edge of the Filder

- Frauenkopf (462.3 m above NN), location of the Stuttgart Telecommunication Tower
- Raichberg (ca. 421 m above NN), Stuttgart-Ost, location of the Stuttgart Transmission Tower
