= Wulle =

Wulle is a German surname. Notable people with the surname include:

- Ernst Wulle (1832–1902), German brewer and entrepreneur
- Reinhold Wulle (1882–1950), German Völkisch politician and journalist
- Rick Wulle (born 1994), German footballer
