= Dürrbach =

Dürrbach may refer to:

- Dürrbach (Neckar), a river of Baden-Württemberg, Germany, tributary of the Neckar
- Dürrbach (Orla), a river of Thuringia, Germany, tributary of the Orla
- Dürrbach, a river of the canton of Basel-Landschaft, Switzerland
