= Timeline of Mannheim =

The following is a timeline of the history of the city of Mannheim, Germany.

== Prior to 19th century ==
- 1606 - Mannheimer Rheinschanze (fortification) construction begins.
- 1607 - Mannheim granted town privileges by Frederick IV, Elector Palatine.
- 1622 - Thirty Years' War: Capture of Mannheim by Imperial-Spanish forces.
- 1660 - Synagogue built.^{(de)}
- 1688 - Mannheim taken by French forces during the Nine Years' War.
- 1689 - Fire.
- 1701 - Almshouse (predecessor of university hospital mannheim) founded
- 1706 - Lemle-Moses-Klaussynagoge founded.
- 1720 - Residence of Charles III Philip, Elector Palatine relocated to Mannheim from Heidelberg.
- 1729 - Population: 15,760.^{(de)}
- 1731 - Mannheim Palace Church built.
- 1756 - Jesuit Church, Mannheim built.
- 1759 - Mannheim Palace completed.
- 1766 - Population: 24,190.^{(de)}
- 1771 - Town Hall built.
- 1774 - Mannheim Observatory tower built.
- 1775 - Deutsche Gesellschaft in Mannheim active.
- 1779
  - Zeughaus (Mannheim) (arsenal) built.
  - Mannheim National Theatre founded.
- 1782 - 13 January: Premiere of Schiller's play The Robbers.
- 1788 - Palais Bretzenheim built.

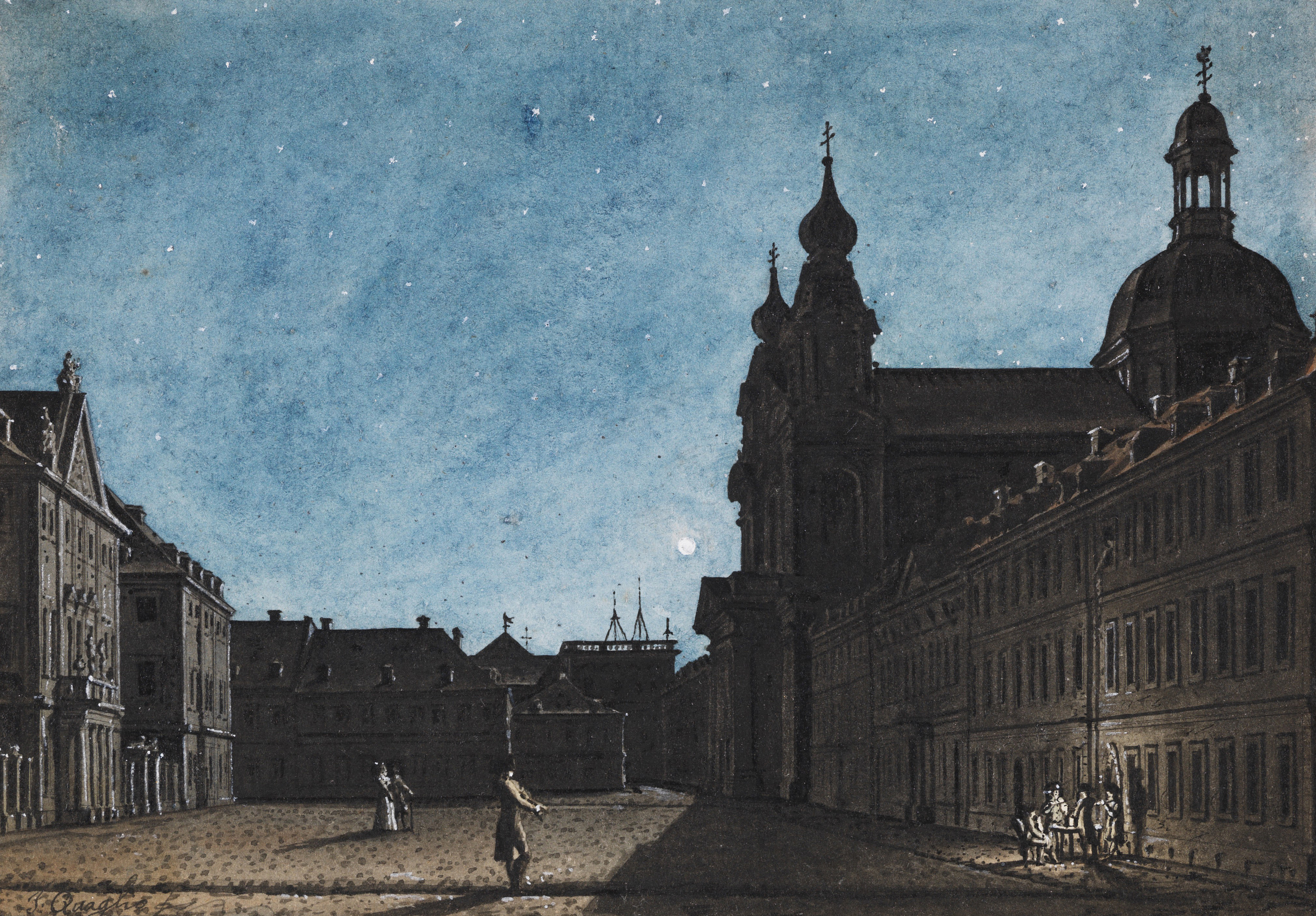
Mannheim in the 1790s

- 1794 - French in power.
- 1795
  - Mannheim besieged during the Campaigns of 1795 in the French Revolutionary Wars.
  - Austrians in power.

== 19th century ==
- 1803 - Mannheim becomes part of the Electorate of Baden.
- 1806 - Mannheim becomes part of the Grand Duchy of Baden.
- 1819 - March: Writer August von Kotzebue assassinated.
- 1828 - Mannheim Harbour opens on the Rhine river.
- 1837 - Mannheimer Journal newspaper begins publication.
- 1840 - Heidelberg-Mannheim railway begins operating.
- 1849 - Political unrest during the Baden Revolution.
- 1855 - Hauptsynagoge (Mannheim) (synagogue) built.
- 1859 - Heinrich Lanz AG machinery manufactory in business.
- 1876 - Mannheim Hauptbahnhof (train station) built.
- 1880 - Population: 53,465.
- 1891 - Mannheim Fire Brigade active.
- 1895 - Friesenheimer Insel becomes part of Mannheim.
- 1896 - Population: 94,160.^{(de)}
- 1897 - Käfertal becomes part of Mannheim.
- 1899 - Neckarau becomes part of Mannheim.
- 1900 - Population: 141,131.

== 20th century ==
=== 1900s-1940s ===
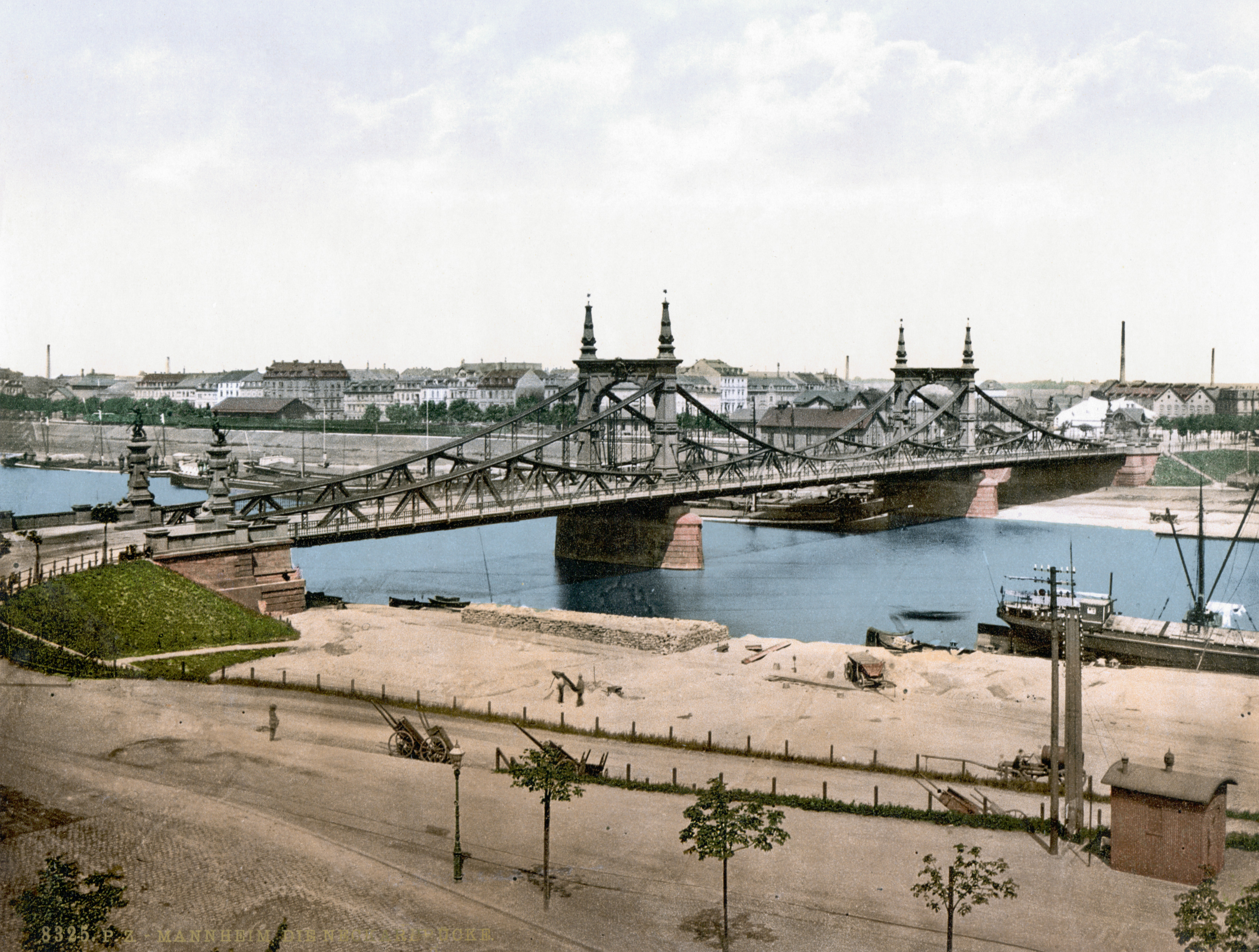
Mannheim in the 1900s

- 1905 - Population: 162,607.
- 1907
  - Industriehafen Mannheim (harbour) opens on the Neckar river.
  - Stadtarchiv Mannheim (city archives) established.
  - Kunsthalle Mannheim (exhibit hall) built.
  - SV Waldhof Mannheim (sport club) formed.
  - Population: 173,424.^{(de)}
- 1910 - Feudenheim becomes part of Mannheim.
- 1911
  - Christuskirche (Mannheim) (church) built.
  - Population: 200,285.^{(de)}
- 1912 - Mannheim Firehouse built.
- 1913 - Rheinau and Sandhofen become part of Mannheim.
- 1914 - Bachchor Mannheim (choir) formed.
- 1919 - Population: 229,576.
- 1924 - Mannheim Hospital (now University Hospital Mannheim) opened on the banks of the river Neckar
- 1925 - "Neue Sachlichkeit" art exhibition held.
- 1926 - Airfield established at Neuostheim.
- 1929 - Wallstadt becomes part of Mannheim.
- 1930
  - Friedrichsfeld, Kirschgartshausen, Sandtorf, Seckenheim, Straßenheim become part of Mannheim.
  - Population: 271,833.^{(de)}
- 1938
  - November: Kristallnacht pogrom against Jews.
  - Landkreis Mannheim (district) formed.
  - Eisstadion am Friedrichspark (ice rink) built.
- 1940 - Bombing of Mannheim in World War II begins.

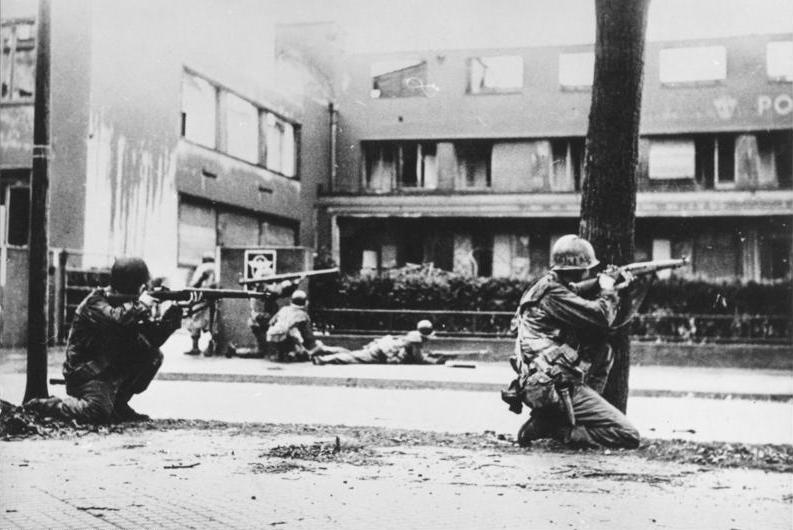
American troops in Mannheim in 1945

- 1944
  - September: Mannheim-Sandhofen subcamp of the Natzweiler-Struthof concentration camp established for Poles deported from Warsaw during the Warsaw Uprising.
  - 2 October: First attempt to escape from the Mannheim-Sandhofen subcamp.
  - 15 December: Three Polish prisoners of the Mannheim-Sandhofen subcamp killed in an Allied bombing.
- 1945
  - 4 January: Public execution of a Polish prisoner of the Mannheim-Sandhofen subcamp.
  - February: Some prisoners deported from the Mannheim-Sandhofen subcamp to forced labour in Kochendorf.
  - March: Remaining prisoners deported to Vaihingen an der Enz and Kochendorf; Mannheim-Sandhofen subcamp dissolved.
  - 29 March: Americans capture the city.
  - 6 April: Prisoner of War Executive (PWX) Camp No. 1 for liberated Allied POWs established.
  - June: The PWX Camp No. 1 converted into the Polish PWX Camp No. 1.
  - July: United States Coleman Army Airfield begins operating.
- 1946
  - Mannheimer Morgen newspaper begins publication.
  - Polish PWX Camp No. 1 converted into the Tadeusz Kościuszko Civilian Guard Training Center, and later renamed to Tadeusz Kościuszko Theater Civilian Guard Training and Replacement Center for former Polish POWs.
- 1947
  - United States military Benjamin Franklin Village established.
  - 8 November: Polish Tadeusz Kościuszko Theater Civilian Guard Training and Replacement Center dissolved.
- 1949 - Mannheim Waterways and Shipping office established.

=== 1950s-1990s ===
- 1955 - Mannheimer Liste Free Voters established.
- 1957 - National Theatre Mannheim rebuilt.
- 1959 - Rhine Bridge rebuilt.
- 1961 - Population: 313,890.^{(de)}
- 1967 - University of Mannheim established.
- 1970
  - Landgericht Mannheim (courthouse) built.
  - Population: 332,378.^{(de)}
- 1972 - Kurt-Schumacher-Brücke (Mannheim) (bridge) opens.
- 1975
  - Fernmeldeturm Mannheim (communication tower) erected.
  - National Bundesgartenschau 1975 (garden show) held in Mannheim.
- 1976 - Federal electoral districts Mannheim I, II, and III formed.
- 1979 - Odeon cinema opens.

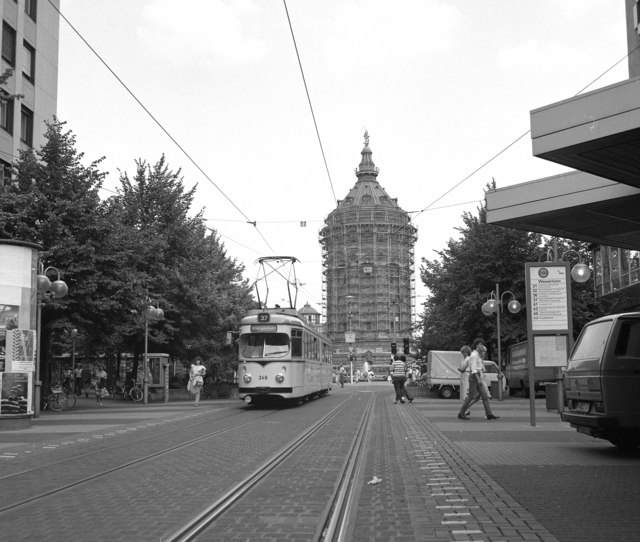
Mannheim in the 1980s

- 1987 - Synagoge (Mannheim) built on the Paradeplatz (Mannheim).
- 1991
  - Mannheimer Stadthaus (city hall) built.
  - Mannheim–Stuttgart high-speed railway begins operating.
- 1992 - Revised federal electoral districts Mannheim I and II formed.
- 1994
  - 5 December: Aircraft crashes into the Fernmeldeturm.
  - Carl-Benz-Stadion (stadium) opens.
- 1995 - Yavuz Sultan Selim Mosque built.

== 21st century ==
- 2002 - Revised federal Mannheim (electoral district) formed.
- 2003
  - Popakademie Baden-Württemberg (music school) established.
  - Glaskubus memorial erected on the Mannheimer Planken.
- 2004 - Musikpark Mannheim (business office) opens.
- 2005 - SAP Arena opens.
- 2007
  - Peter Kurz becomes mayor.
  - August: City hosts the 2007 FEI European Jumping Championship.
- 2010
  - May: City co-hosts the 2010 IIHF World Championship.
  - Population: 313,174.^{(de)}
- 2011 - United States Army Garrison Mannheim closes.
- 2014 - 25 May: Baden-Württemberg local election, 2014 held.^{(de)}
- 2024 Mannheim stabbing
- 2025 Mannheim car attack

== See also ==
- History of Mannheim
- List of monuments in Mannheim
- History of Baden-Württemberg state
- History of Baden territory (in German)

Other cities in the state of Baden-Württemberg:^{(de)}

- Timeline of Stuttgart

== Bibliography ==
in English

- "Mannheim". Chambers's Encyclopaedia. London. 1901. hdl:2027/njp.32101065312926.
- "Mannheim", Jewish Encyclopedia, vol. 8, New York, 1904, hdl:2027/mdp.49015002282243
- "Mannheim" . Encyclopædia Britannica. Vol. 17 (11th ed.). 1910. pp. 588–589.
- "Mannheim", The Rhine, Leipzig: Karl Baedeker, 1911, OCLC 21888483

in German

- J. C. Rieger (1824). Historisch- topographisch- statistische beschreibung von Mannheim und seiner umgebung (in German).
- "Mannheim". Brockhaus' Konversations-Lexikon (in German) (14th ed.). Leipzig: Brockhaus. 1896. hdl:2027/njp.32101064064551.
- Chronik der Hauptstadt Mannheim (in German) 1901-
- Max Oeser (1908). Geschichte der Stadt Mannheim (in German).
- P. Krauss und E. Uetrecht, ed. (1913). "Mannheim-Ludwigshafen". Meyers Deutscher Städteatlas [Meyer's Atlas of German Cities] (in German). Leipzig: Bibliographisches Institut.
- Dieter Wolf (2003), Luftkriegsereignisse in Mannheim 1939-1945 (PDF) (in German) (2nd ed.), Stadtarchiv Mannheim
- Geschichte der Stadt Mannheim (in German). Heidelberg: Verlag Regionalkultur. 2007-2009 (3 vols)
