= Ernst Wulle =

German entrepreneur

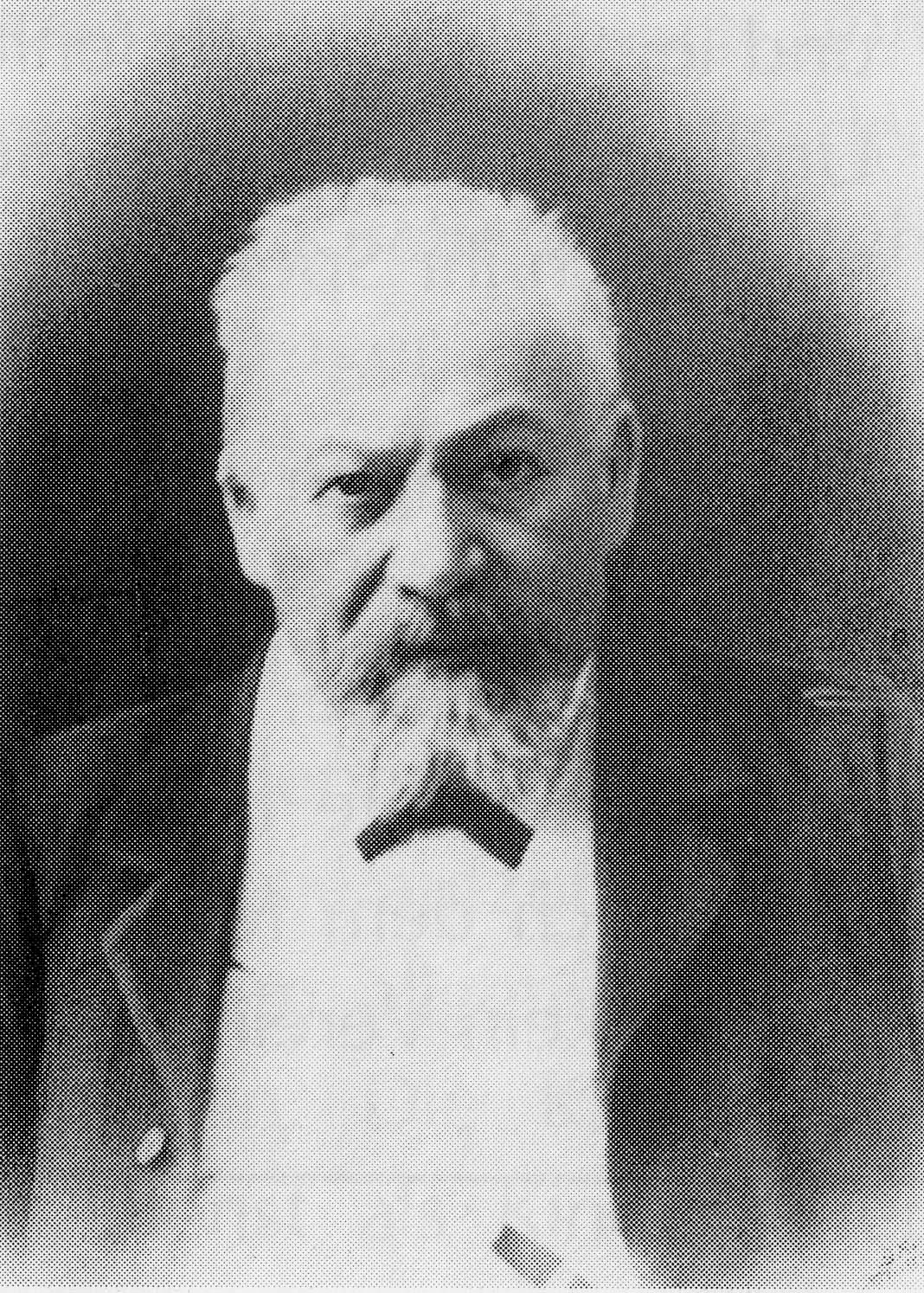
Ernst Wulle

Ernst Immanuel Wulle (15 February 1832, Nehren – 8 December 1902, Stuttgart) was a German brewer, entrepreneur, and the founder of a nonprofit organization.

== Life ==
The funeral sermon held by city pastor Jehle at the funeral of Ernst Immanuel Wulle

Ernst Wulle was born the son of a carpenter in Nehren and grew up under poor conditions. One of his uncles provided him with an apprenticeship as a brewer in Stuttgart. He later married Wilhelmine Storz, née Mauchart, a woman from a wealthy family. With his knowledge as a brewer and the capital acquired through the marriage he founded the Wulle-Brewery together with a partner, who left the company shortly after.

Ernst Wulle never forgot his background. In 1900 he founded the “Ernst Wulle Stiftung” (Ernst Wulle Foundation) and gave 5000 Mark as starting capital. From this, the Kindergarten “Auchert” was built in Nehren in 1901. At the inauguration of the building Wulle received the honorary citizenship of Nehren. In remembrance of the founder a road in Nehren was named “Wullestraße” (Wulle road), and in Stuttgart one of the famous little stairways was called “Wullestaffel” (Wulle stairs).

On December 8, 1902 Ernst Wulle died after a short sickness and was buried in section 5 at Pragfriedhof in Stuttgart on December 11. In his funeral sermon, city pastor Jehle described Ernst Wulle as a helper of the poor, and laid further emphasis on Wulle's roles as member of the church parish council and the city council.

== Wulle brewery ==
In 1859, together with his business partner Maier, Wulle bought the plots Neckarstraße 60 and 62 up to the middle of the Kernerplatz in Stuttgart.

During construction, the plots turned out to be too small, so expansion was needed. This led to Maier leaving the partnership in 1861.

1896 the company turned into a stock company called "Aktienbrauerei Wulle" (Stock brewery Wulle). The brewery struggled heavily with the Most and wine consumption in Wuerttemberg, due to beer being more expensive.

The beginning of the brewery was marked by many takeovers of other regional breweries:

- 1897: Brauerei Kolb, Stuttgart.
- 1903: Brauerei Siegelberg, Zuffenhausen
- 1906: Brauerei Lechleitner, Esslingen am Neckar
- 1911: Brauereien Engel, Vaihingen/Enz, und C. Widmaier, Möhringen a.d.F.
- 1919: Brauerei Gebr. Leo, Dürrmenz, Mühlacker
- 1929: Gräfl. v. Rechberg'sche Brauerei, Weißenstein

During Nazi rule, Wulle brewery participated in the Winterhilfswerk (Winter Relief of the German People) and the Adolf Hitler Fund of German Trade and Industry, which were donation drives used for financing charity work and helping the economy. The government repeatedly conscripted employees for military exercises. However, their wage was paid fully. Later, family members of soldiers working in the brewery got monthly grants. The first killed employee is registered on 22 May 1940. He fell in France.

Since 1 July 1942, the Spezial-Bier (Special-Beer) was only brewed for the Wehrmacht. In 1943 the malt house was destroyed by an air raid, the brewery itself sustained some damage. Overall, 35 business properties were destroyed by this raid, including the Friedrichsbau, which was built in 1900 by the "Immobilienverein-Aktiengesellschaft" (Real Estate Association Stock Company), that was also founded by Wulle. After the war the company recovered and was able to raise the output of beer continuously. In 1960 the brewery rebuilt the "Wulle-Festsäle" (Wulle festival halls) and purchased the brewery "Zum Hecht" (Pike Brewery).

On 5 April 1971 the end of the brewery was signed by contract. It was taken over by the brewery Dinkelacker, which stopped producing the Wulle beer little by little. Later in the 1970s, the brewing complex was demolished, a hotel and state ministries were built on the plots.

Since 1861, the brewery has used the advertising slogan "Wir wollen Wulle!" (We want Wulle!), which they printed on many glasses, pitchers and ashtrays.

The name Wulle shortly reemerged in 1988. The Wulle brewery was fusioned with the Dinkelacker-owned Cluss brewery to the Cluss-Wulle AG. The subsidiary company purchased one third of the shares of the "Cäcilienpark am Neckar GbR", which built a big living complex with the same name on the location of the former Cluss brewery in Heilbronn.

In 2008, after 37 years, Dinkelacker-Schwaben-Bräu brewery reintroduced the Wulle brand to the market.

In 2014 the advertising slogan "We want Wulle!" was set to music by the punk band "Schmutzki" to express their love for the beer. Since that, the brewery is sponsoring the free beer, which is given away before every concert on their tours.

In 2020, the second beer was introduced with "Wulle Pils" (Wulle Pilsner). With an original gravity over 12%, it is a reimagination of their older products.

=== Products ===
- Wulle Vollbier Hell (available in the 500-millilitre (17 US fl oz) Euro bottle, 330-millilitre (11 US fl oz) flip-top bottle and 500 mL can)
- Wulle Pils (available in the 330 mL swingtop bottle)

== Wulle help association ==
1941 the Wulle-Hilfe e.V. (Wulle help association) was founded with a starting capital of 100.000 Reichsmark. The purpose of this non-profit organization was the support of needy employees, this was achieved with single or multiple financial donations. This money came from the Wulle brewery. In 1970 the club assets were 1.235.634,18 DM.

After the takeover from Dinkelacker 1971, both non-profit organizations “Dinkelacker-Unterstützungskasse” (Dinkelacker support fund) and “Wulle-Hilfe” were fused.

On the 11th of July 2005 the supporting fund was deleted from the official club register. The assets were transferred to Dinkelacker.

== Wulle festival ==
During his whole life Ernst Wulle donated food and drink on his visits in his hometown Nehren. This slowly developed into little festivals.

The tradition was also resurrected by Dinkelacker-Schwabenbräu on the 1st of August 2009. The now called “Wulle-Fest” in Nehren is held every two years and is sponsored by the brewery.

== Literature ==
- Jürgen Jonas: Nehren und Hauchlingen beinander. Geschichte und Geschichten aus 500 Jahren. Verlag Sindlinger-Burchartz, Frickenhausen 2004, ISBN 3-928812-36-X.
- Gemeindeverwaltung Nehren: Nehren 1086 – 1986. Herausgeber Gemeindeverwaltung Nehren
- Deutsche Wirtschaftsbücherei, Band 7, „Die Deutschen Brauereien“, Jahrgang 1929, Verlag für Börsen- und Finanzliteratur A.-G., Berlin, Leipzig 1929
- Leichenpredigt "Worte der Erinnerung an Ernst Wulle, gesprochen von Herrn Stadtpfarrer Jehle", Stuttgart, Druck J. F. Steinkopf (Provided by the Verein für Familienkunde in Baden-Württemberg e. V., Stuttgart)
