= Dürrbach (Neckar) =

River in Baden-Württemberg, Germany

Location
- Country: Germany
- State: Baden-Württemberg

Physical characteristics
- Source
  - location: Northeast of the district and similar named mountain Frauenkopf of Stuttgart
  - coordinates: 48.7672°N 9.2125°E
- Mouth
  - location: into the Neckar at Hedelfingen, a district of Stuttgart
  - coordinates: 48.7617°N 9.2580°E

Basin features
- Progression: Neckar→ Rhine→ North Sea

Dürrbach is a river of Baden-Württemberg, Germany.

The Dürrbach springs northeast of the district and similar named mountain Frauenkopf of Stuttgart. It is a left tributary of the Neckar in Hedelfingen, a district of Stuttgart.

== See also ==
- List of rivers of Baden-Württemberg
