= Fernsehturm Stuttgart =

SWR Fernsehturm Stuttgart
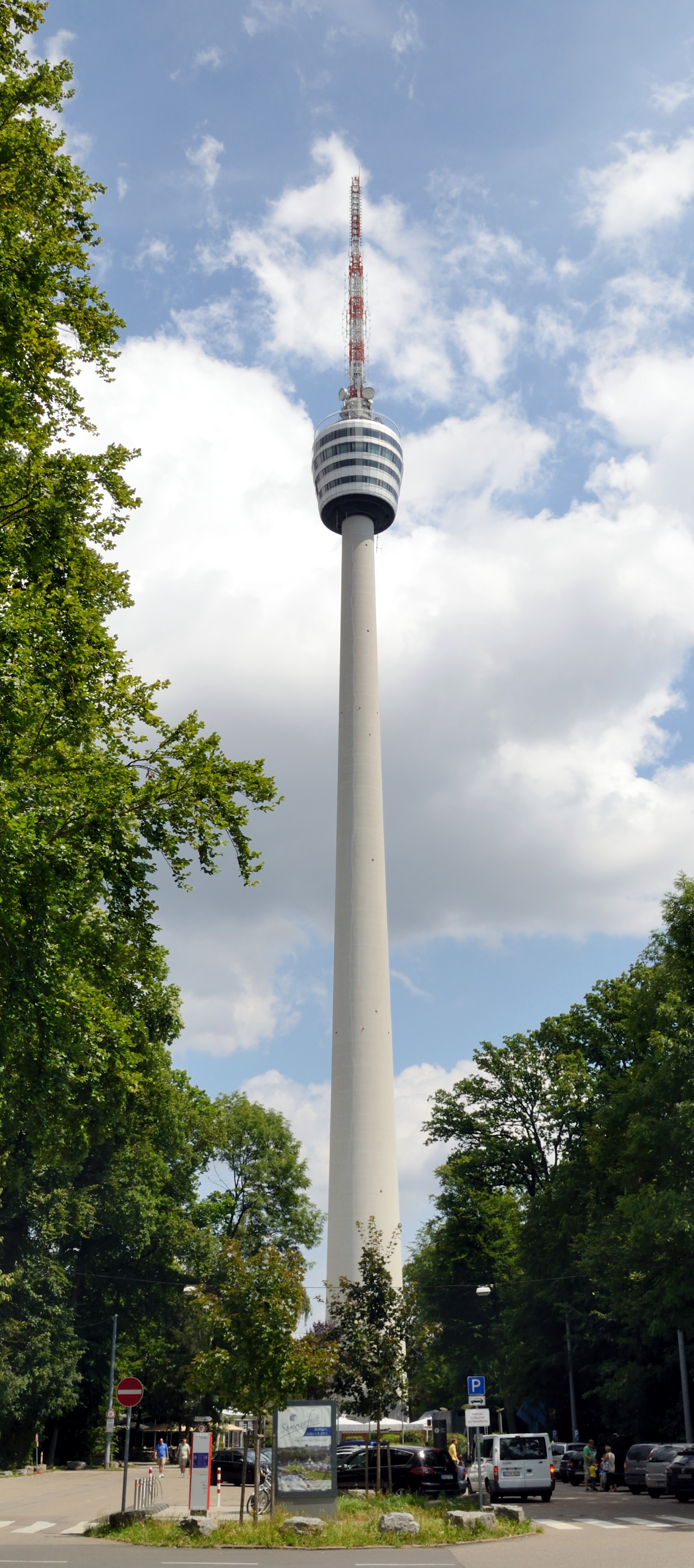
- Interactive map of the SWR Fernsehturm Stuttgart area

General information
- Status: Completed
- Type: Telecommunications; Observation tower
- Architectural style: Modernism
- Location: Jahnstraße 120; Stuttgart, Germany
- Coordinates: 48.755757°N 9.190172°E
- Construction started: 10 January 1954
- Completed: 5 February 1956
- Renovated: 1965
- Cost: 4.2 million DM (1956); ~10 million Euro (2021)
- Owner: Südwestrundfunk

Height
- Antenna spire: 216.61 m (710.7 ft)

Design and construction
- Architects: Heinle, Wischer and Partner
- Engineer: Fritz Leonhardt
- Main contractor: G. Epple; Wayss & Freytag

Fernsehturm Stuttgart (English: SWR TV Tower Stuttgart) is a 216.61 m (710.7 ft) telecommunications tower in Stuttgart, Germany. It was the world's first telecommunications tower constructed from reinforced concrete, and is thus the original modernist architecture highrise needle tower with a "basket" atop that would be built worldwide in the following years. Although controversial at first, it quickly became a well known landmark of Stuttgart and a tourist attraction.

== Location ==
The tower is located on the hill Hoher Bopser (elevation 483 meters) in the southern Stuttgart borough of Degerloch. From the observation decks, there is a view of Stuttgart, from the forests and vineyards in and around Stuttgart to the Swabian Jura and the Black Forest.

The Waldau-Stadion (Gazi-Stadion auf der Waldau) is located near the tower; games played there are often described as "under the TV tower" or "in the shade of the TV tower".

== History ==
The tower's construction was controversial – critics opposed the new building method and its costs; a simple 200-meter antenna array would have cost just 200,000 DM. Construction began on 10 January 1954 and continued for 20 months. This made it the first telecom tower in the world built with reinforced concrete. The construction cost was 4.2 million DM. Revenues from visitors reached that sum within five years. The tower was placed in service on 5 February 1956 by Süddeutscher Rundfunk (today Südwestrundfunk – SWR). It was part of the German state visit of Queen Elizabeth II of the United Kingdom in May 1965.

The tower reached its current height of 216.61 m (710.7 ft) when the antenna was extended from October 1965 to December 1965.

== Specifications ==
- Engineer: Fritz Leonhardt
- Altitude: Foot of tower 483 m (1,585 ft) above sea level
- Overall height to the antenna point: 216.8 m (711 ft)
- Height of upper observation deck: 153.5 m (504 ft)
- Height of lower observation deck: 150 m (490 ft)
- Diameter of foundation: 27 m (89 ft)
- Total weight of tower: approximately 3,000 tons
- Weight of foundation: approximately 1,500 tons
- Speed of elevators: 5 m/s (16 ft/s)
- Panorama Café on a platform of the tower basket
- Maximum diameter of tower basket: 15 m (49 ft)

== Broadcasting ==
The tower is still known as Fernsehturm but today only broadcasts several public FM radio stations. Transmission of the ARD TV network's analogue service stopped in 2006. The digital television services have moved to nearby Fernmeldeturm Stuttgart, which also broadcasts private FM radio stations in the area.

== Air traffic warning lights ==
The tower carries beside the conventional red air traffic warning lights three rotating xenon lamps similar to those used on lighthouses just above the observation deck.

== Public access ==
On 27 March 2013, the tower was closed to the public because of a review of fire safety regulations. The tower was reopened on 30 January 2016 with a refurbished entrance, shop area and new, optimised fire safety precautions.

== Gallery ==
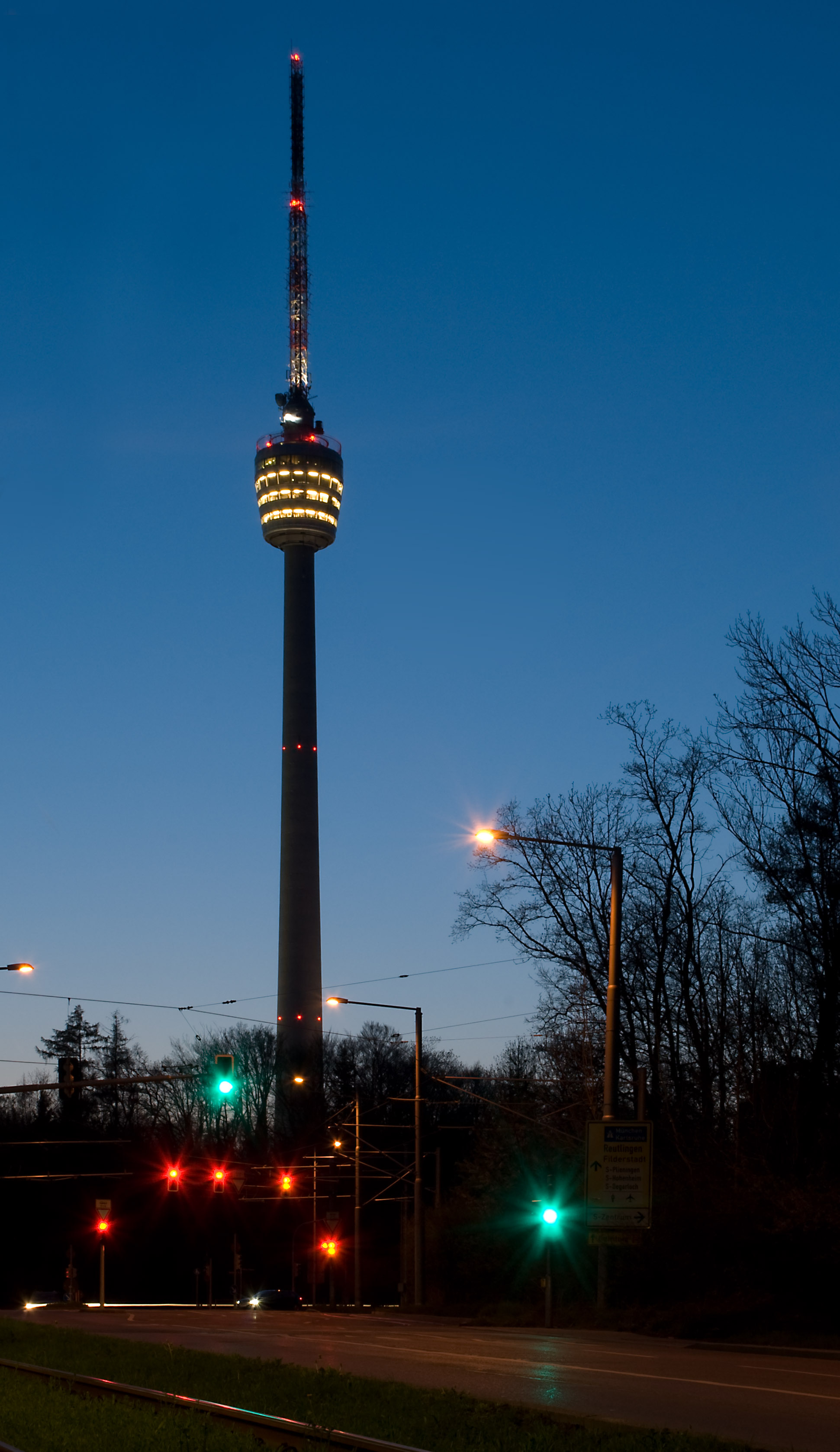
Fernsehturm Stuttgart after dark

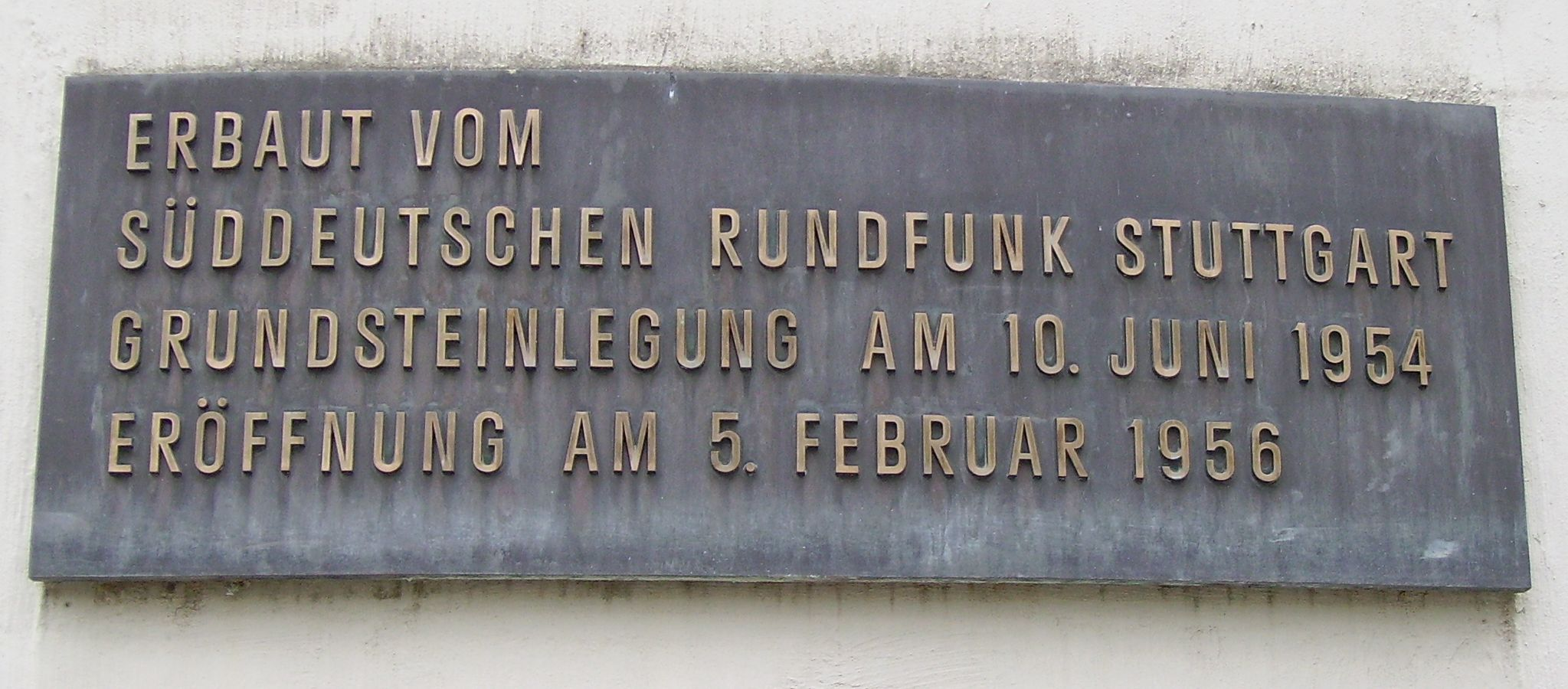
Commemorative plaque at the tower's base

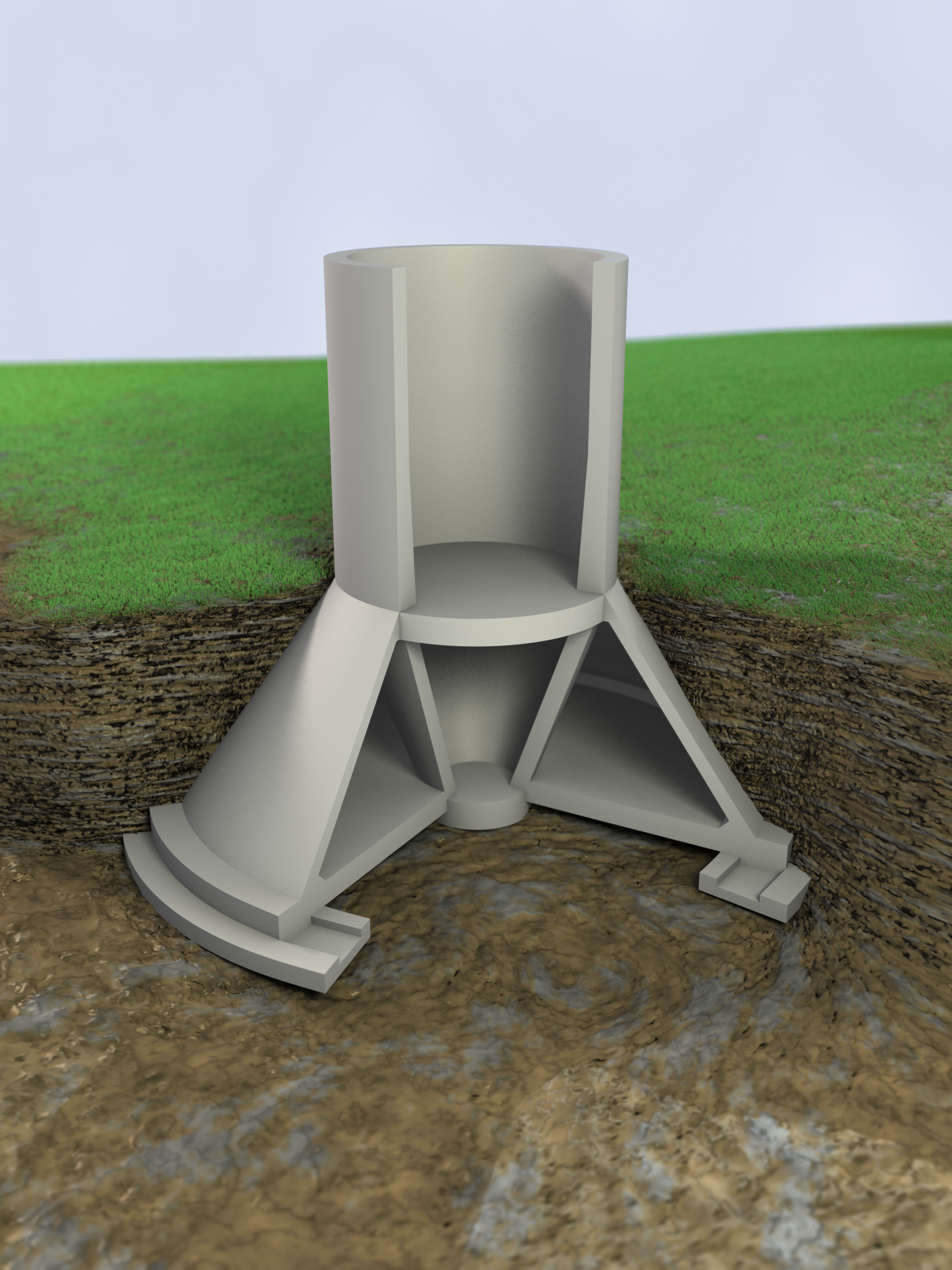
Foundation of Fernsehturm Stuttgart

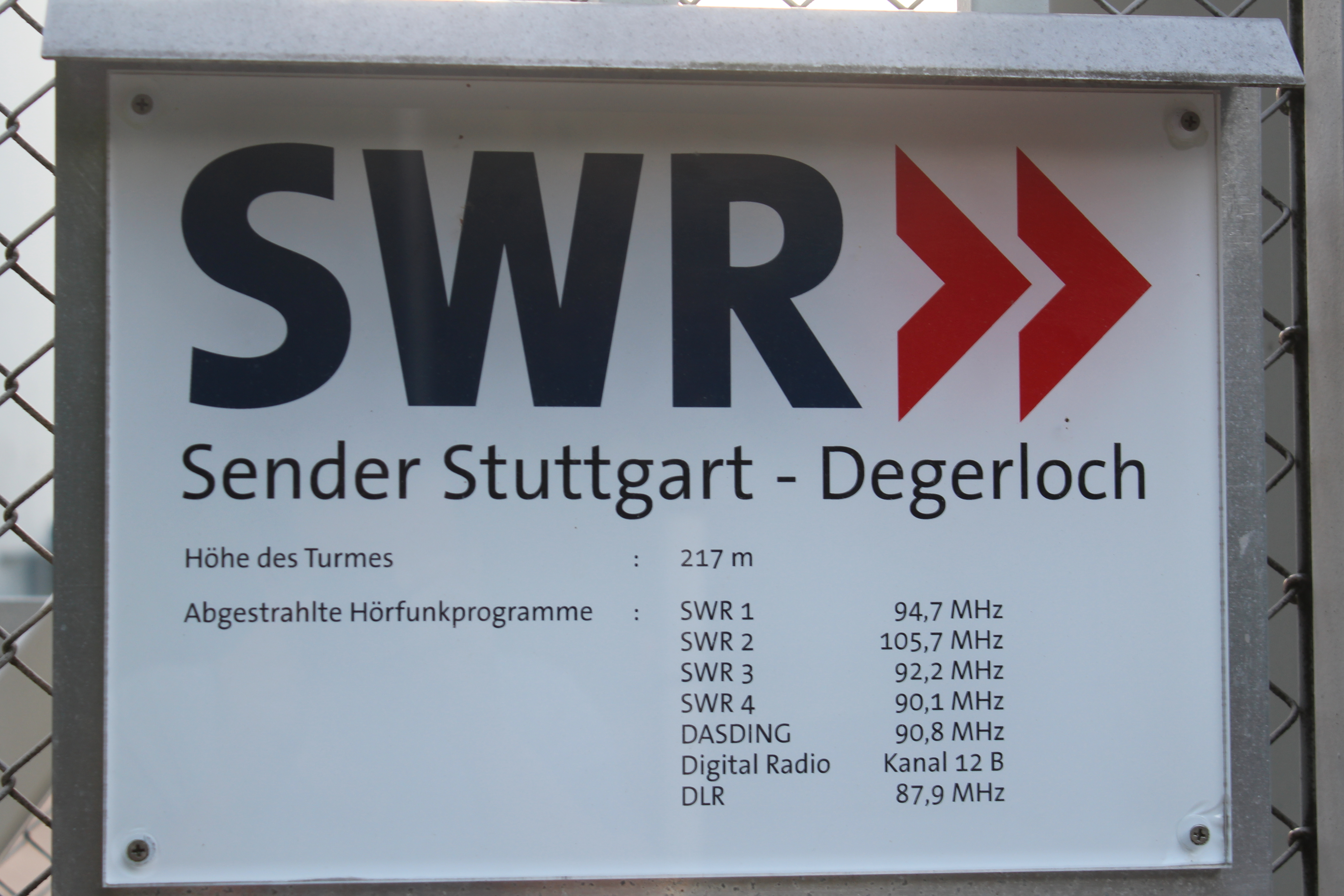
Stations transmitted from the tower

Tower basket

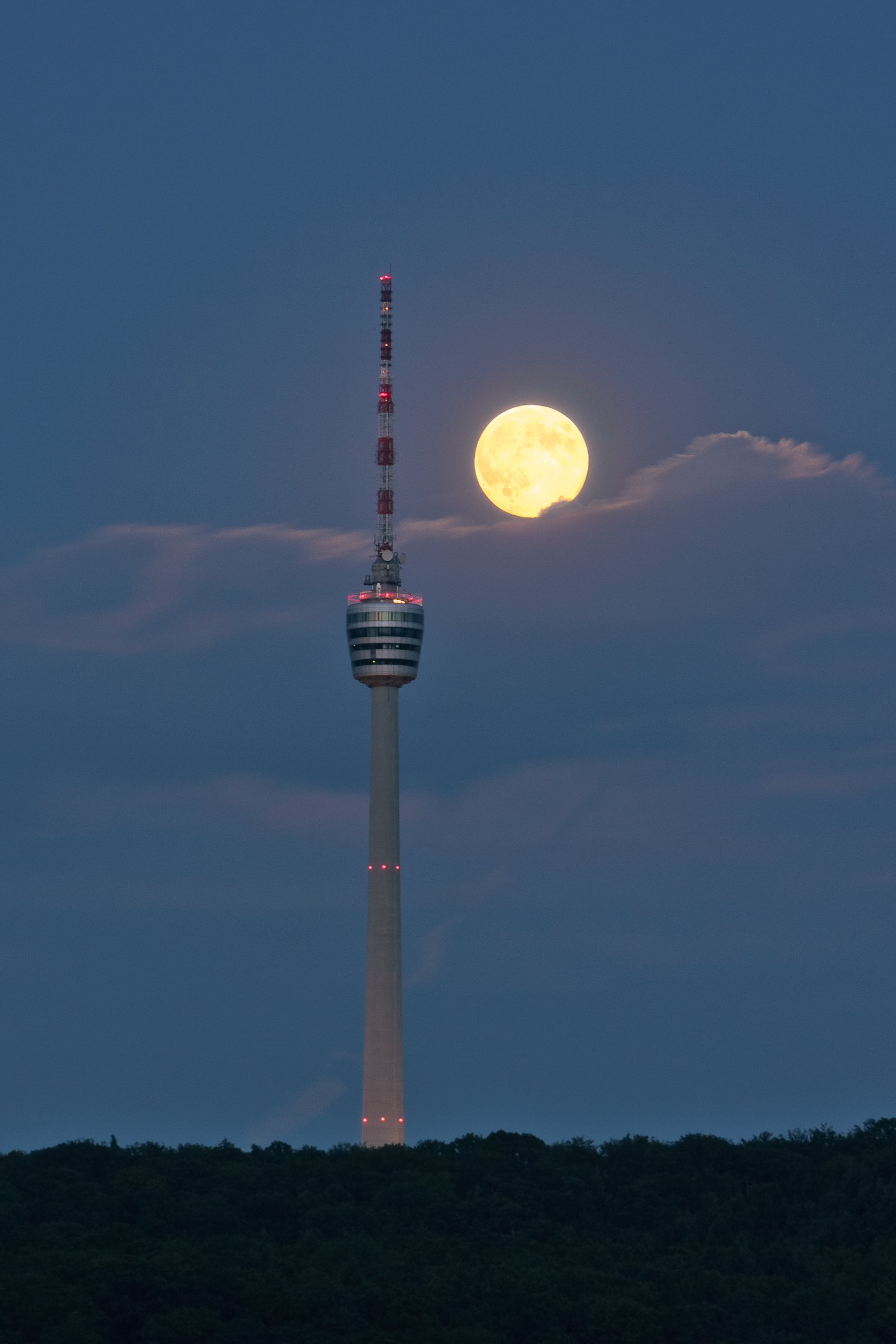
The tower in 2013, with the full moon rising behind it, seen from the west

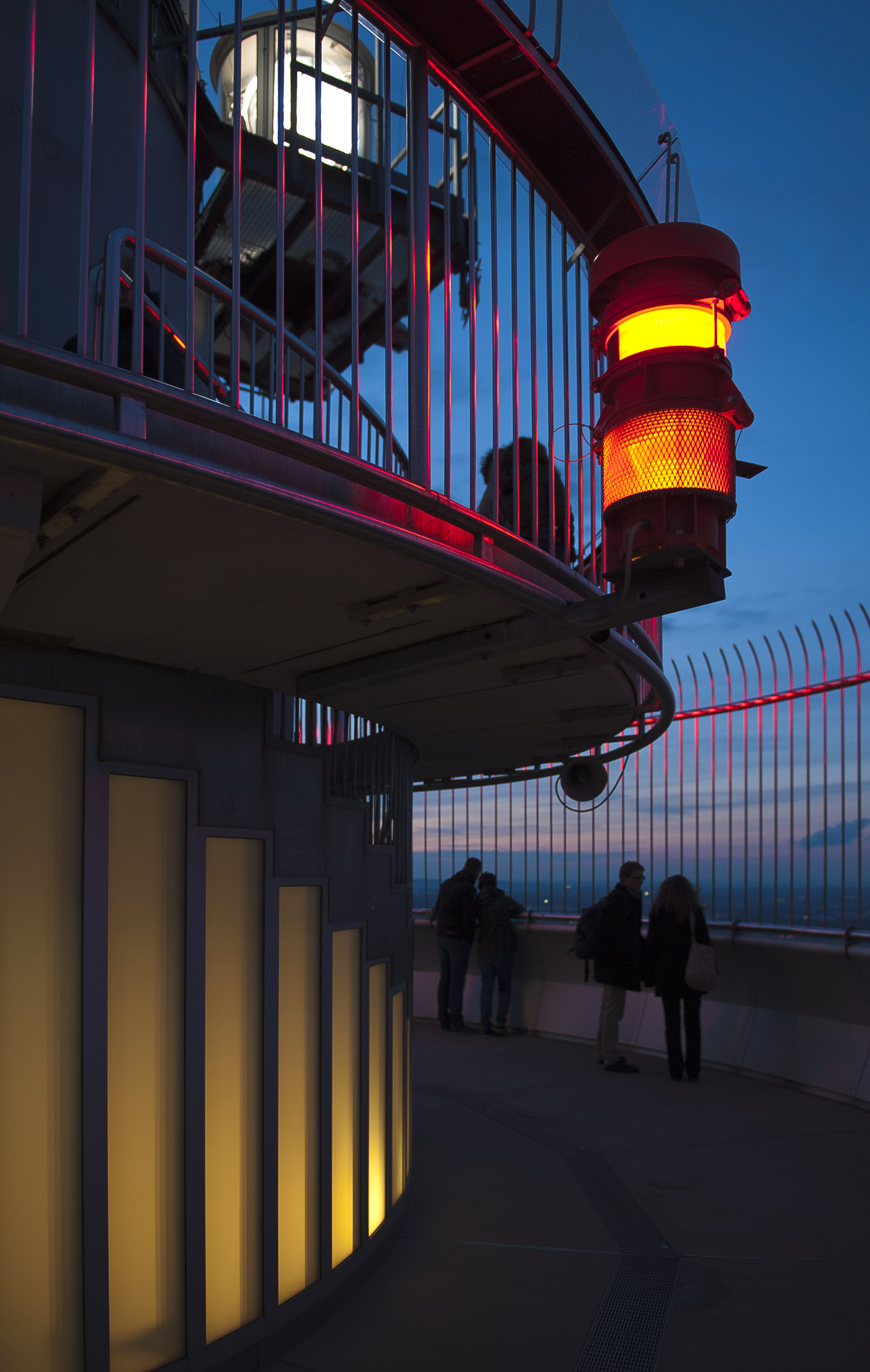
Observation deck

== See also ==
- Florianturm, Dortmund
- Fernmeldeturm Mannheim
- Rheinturm Düsseldorf
- Sentech Tower, Johannesburg
- Donauturm, Vienna
- CN Tower, Toronto
- Macau Tower
- Sky Tower (Auckland), Auckland
- Fernsehturm Berlin
- Space Needle, Seattle
- Ostankino Tower, Moscow
