= Peter Kurz =

German politician; former Lord major of Mannheim

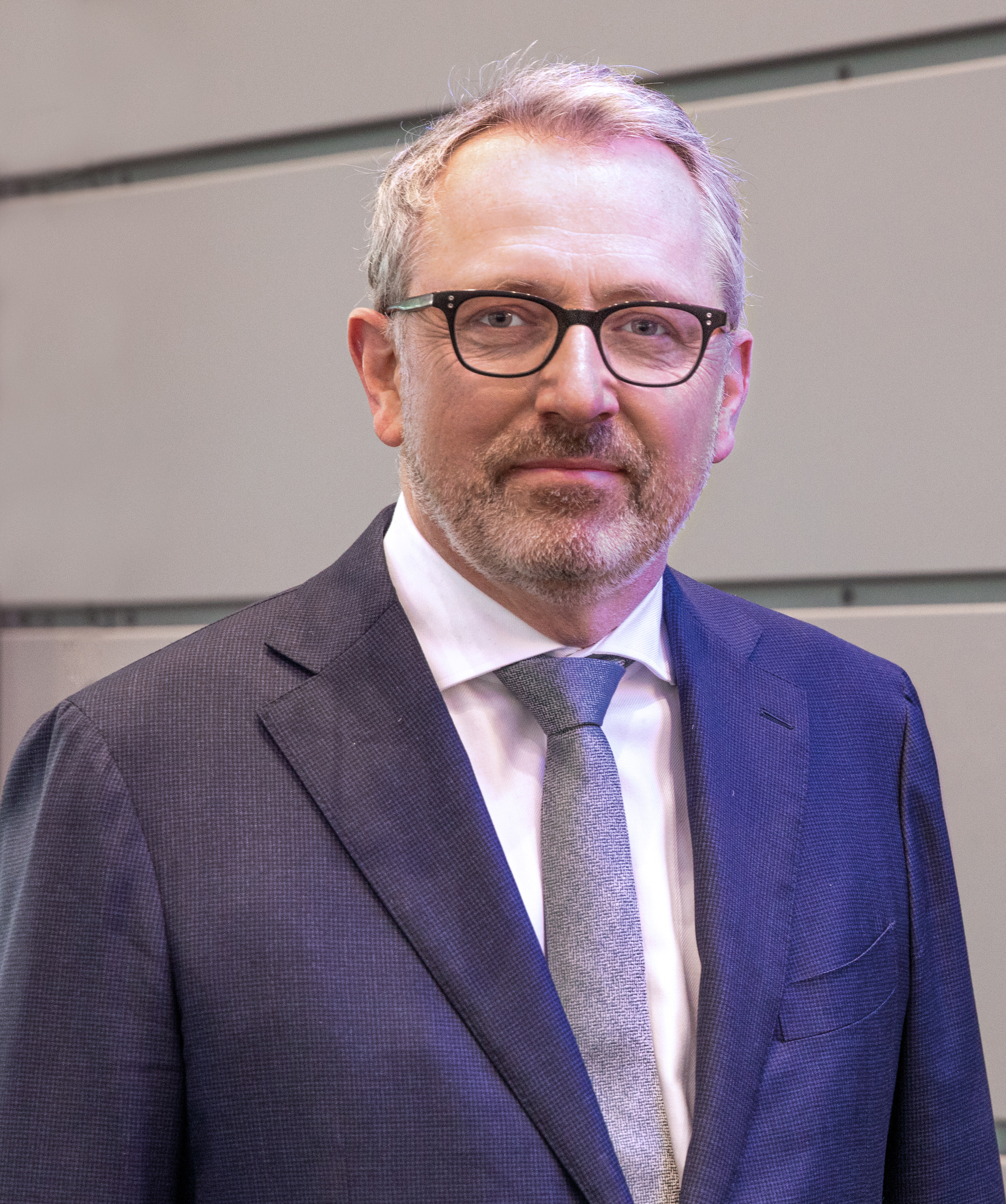
- Kurz in 2021
- Born: 6 November 1962 (age 63); Mannheim, Baden-Württemberg, Germany
- Education: Tulla-Gymnasium; Universities of Mannheim and Heidelberg
- Occupation: Politician
- Political party: Social Democratic Party of Germany (SPD)
- Spouse: Yes
- Children: 2
- Awards: See Awards
- Website: Official website

Peter Kurz (born 1962) is a German politician of the Social Democratic Party of Germany (SPD). He was the Lord mayor of Mannheim, the second-largest city in the German state of Baden-Württemberg, from 4 August 2007 to 3 August 2023.

== Life ==
Peter Kurz was born on 6 November 1962 in Mannheim, Baden-Württemberg, Germany. He attended the Tulla-Gymnasium in Mannheim. From 1983 to 1989, he studied law at the universities of Mannheim and Heidelberg and passed his first state examination in 1989. He then worked as a trainee lawyer in Mannheim (Amts- und Landgericht, Staatsanwaltschaft, Verwaltungsgerichtshof, Rechtsanwaltskanzlei), Speyer (Hochschule für Verwaltungswissenschaften), Heidelberg (Finanzamt) and San Diego (Rechtsanwaltskanzlei). In 1992, he passed his second state examination and became an assistant at the chair for civil law, commercial and business law at the University of Mannheim. In 1994 Kurz became a judge at the Karlsruhe Administrative Court. A year later he received his doctorate. Until he was elected mayor for schools, culture, sports and swimming pools in 1999, he worked as a judge at the Karlsruhe Administrative Court. From 4 August 2007 to 3 August 2023, he was the Lord mayor of Mannheim.

Kurz is married and has two children.

== Political career ==
Kurz joined the SPD while still at school and became involved with Jusos, the party's working group for young people. From 1984 to 1989, he served as a member of the District Council of Schwetzingerstadt/Oststadt in Mannheim and thereafter, up to 1999, as a councillor in Mannheim and member of various supervisory boards. In 1985, Kurz founded the association Biotopia, which he managed up to the beginning of 1999. In early 1994, Peter Kurz assumed the chairmanship of the SPD parliamentary group in the municipal council, an office which he held up to 1999. He became a member of the SPD state executive board in Baden Wuerttemberg in 1995 (up to 2005). Kurz assumed the office of full-time Deputy Mayor for Education, Culture and Sport in Mannheim in 1999. The decision to set up the first full-time primary school in Mannheim was passed during his period in the office of Deputy Mayor for Education. On 17 June 2007 he was elected to succeed Gerhard Widder (SPD) as mayor of the city. In 2010 Kurz successfully campaigned for the retention of the Jobcenter. On 14 June 2015 he won 46.8% of the votes in the first ballot of the mayoral election before being elected to a second period of office on 5 July, taking 52% of the votes in the second ballot, in which he went head-to-head with Peter Rosenberger (CDU).

In December 2014, Mannheim was awarded the title UNESCO City of Music. The application was particularly championed by Kurz.

In 2018, Kurz was elected President of the Baden-Wuerttemberg Association of German Cities (Städtetag Baden-Württemberg) and voted into the steering committee of the Association of German Cities (Städtetag Deutschland), he accompanied these tasks until 3 August 2023.

== European and international activities ==
From April 2018 to January 2020, Kurz represented the German Cities in the European Committee of the Regions (CoR). He has been a deputy member from January 2020.

At European level, Kurz has also been a deputy member of the steering committee of the German section of the Council of European Municipalities and Regions (CEMR) since 2010. The CEMR represents the interests of around 100,000 municipal and regional authorities throughout Europe. The international work of the CEMR is continued in the United Cities and Local Governments (UCLG). Here, Peter Kurz was sitting on the World Council as one of five German municipal representatives and, as one of two German mayors as a member of the Executive Bureau.

Kurz was actively involved in the establishment of the Global Parliament of Mayors (GPM) in 2016 and was deputy chairperson up to November 2019. At the Annual General Meeting of the GPM, which took place in Durban, South Africa, from 9 to 11 November 2019, Kurz was appointed as chair and headed it until he left the office of Lord Mayor. The GPM is a global movement of mayors which advocates the rights of cities and their majors and the "Right to the City". It is a member of the Global Taskforce of Local and Regional Governments.

From 17 to 20 October 2016 Kurz took part in the HABITAT III Conference of the United Nations in Quito, Ecuador. There, Mannheim's municipal leader had the opportunity, as one of only 40 mayors from around the world, to issue a statement at the World Assembly of Mayors, and delivered a plea for the significance of cities.

A major role in international engagement is played by the Sustainable Development Goals, SDGs, of the United Nations which are implemented in Mannheim through the "Mannheim 2030" Mission Statement. In September 2019, as the first German municipal representative invited to do so, Kurz had the opportunity to give what is known as a "voluntary local review" at the SDG Summit in New York, and thus present the strategies employed by the City of Mannheim to implement the SDGs at municipal level. At this multi-day summit, Kurz also represented the UCLG, the GPM and the CEMR.

Kurz was among the speakers at both the 9th World Urban Forum 2018 in Kuala Lumpur, Malaysia and the 10th World Urban Forum 2020 in Abu Dhabi United Arab Emirates, hosted by UN-Habitat. Here too he spoke on the City of Mannheim's strategies to implement the Sustainable Development Goals of the UN at municipal level.

On 14 September 2021, Kurz received the World Mayor International Award 2021. The prize was awarded to Kurz for his commitment to cooperation between cities worldwide. He stands firm in his belief that only cooperation can solve international challenges and influence national developments.

== Supervisory board mandates ==
Kurz chaired the following supervisory boards of municipal subsidiaries and holdings:

- MVV Energie
- MVV GmbH
- Klinikum Mannheim
- GBG – Mannheimer Wohnungsbaugesellschaft
- mannheimer gründungszentren gmbh
- Popakademie Baden-Württemberg (chief chairman)

== Honorary appointments ==
- Member of the executive board of the Baden-Wuerttemberg Association of German Cities (Städtetag Baden-Württemberg) until August 2023
- Member of the Board of the non-profit Association "Future Metropolitan Region Rhine-Neckar" (Zukunft Metropolregion Rhein-Neckar) until August 2023
- Chair of the Regionalforum ICE-Knoten Rhein-Neckar until August 2023

== Awards ==
- In November 2010, Kurz was awarded the "Star of David" award, specially made for him, by the UJA Federation New York.
