= Kriegsberg Tower =

Observation tower and public monument in Stuttgart, Germany

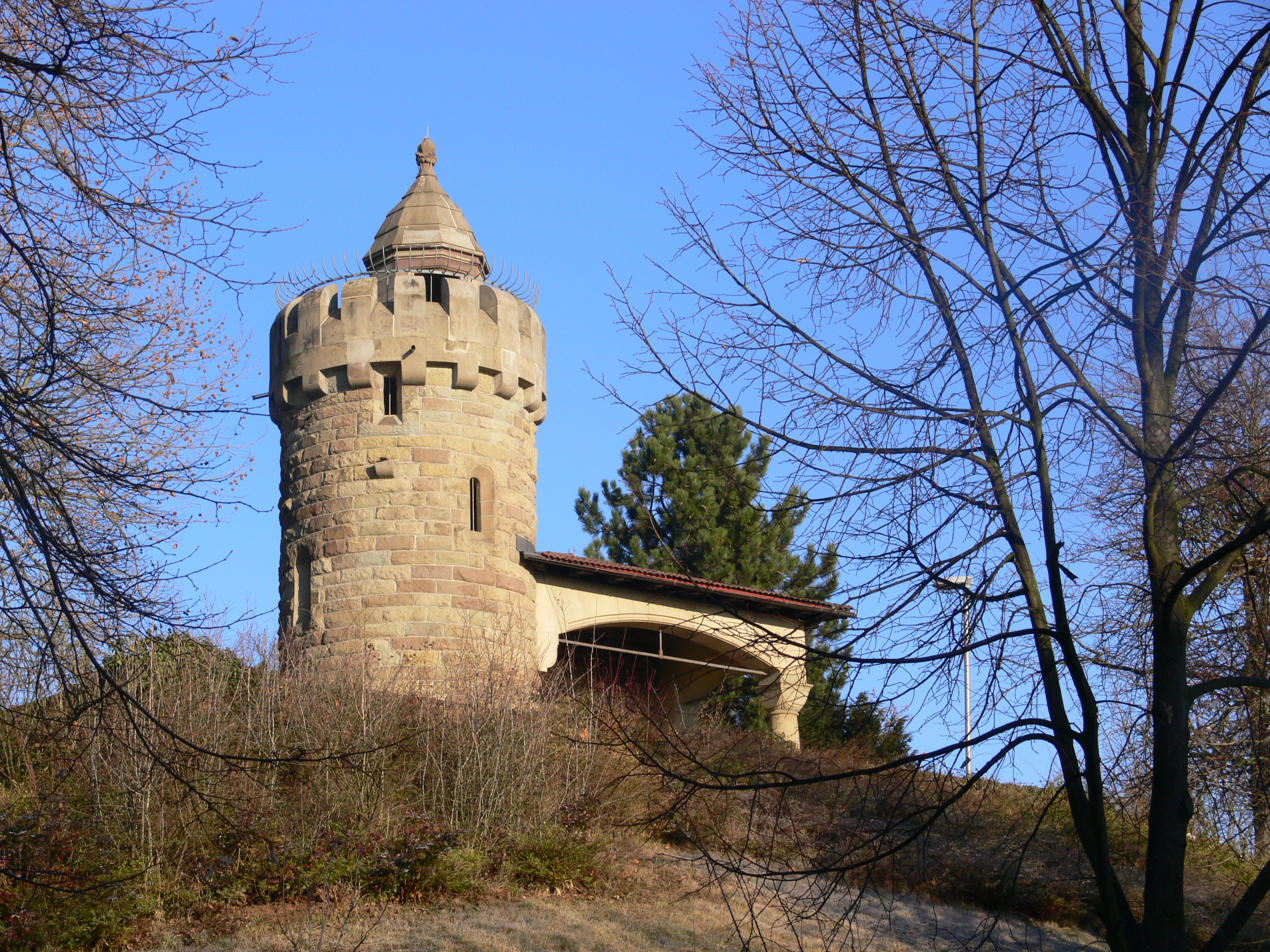
- Kriegsberg Tower
- Location: Stuttgart-Nord
- Coordinates: 48.78762°N 9.17359°E
- Designer: Verschönerungsverein Stuttgart
- Builder: Carl Weigle
- Type: Observation tower
- Material: Sandstone
- Height: Just under 10 m
- Beginning date: 1894
- Completion date: 1895
- Note: Only open on special occasions

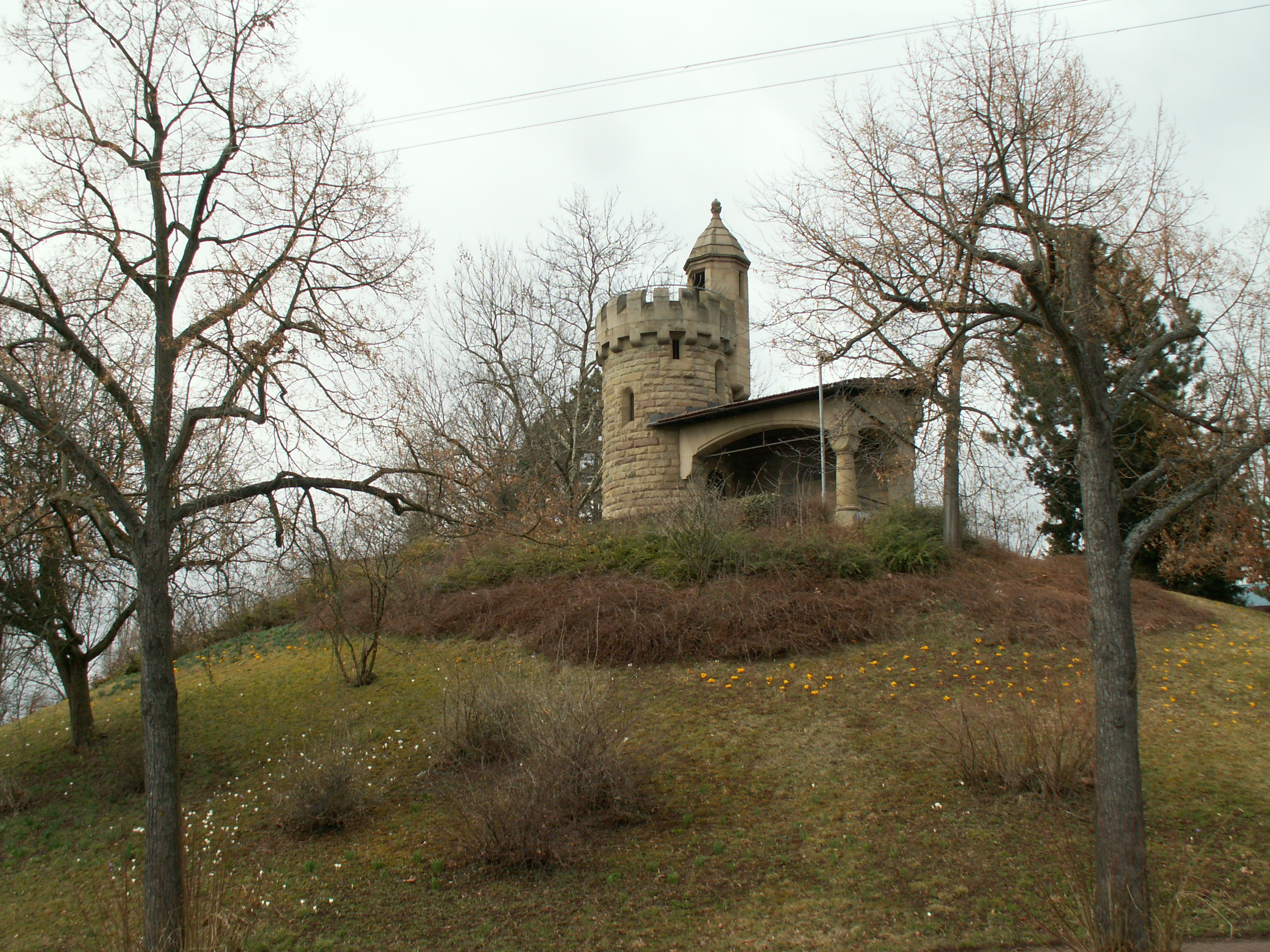
Kriegsberg Tower

The Kriegsberg Tower in the city of Stuttgart (Germany) is an observation tower and public monument. It stands at a height of 353 metres on the hill of Kriegsberg.

== Description ==
The Kriegsberg Tower was built in 1895 by the architect (Baurat) Carl Weigle for the Verschönerungsverein Stuttgart ("Stuttgart Enhancement Society"). The round tower made of sandstone has a viewing platform with a merlon-shaped parapet and an attached open hall and is designed as part of a Romanesque castle. From its platform, it offers a good view of Stuttgart's city centre, the Schurwald forest, and the Rems and Neckar valleys. The tower itself is only open on special occasions.

In the years 1983 to 1995, the tower was restored with the help of donations from Stuttgart citizens, the city of Stuttgart and the Baden-Württemberg State Office for Monuments (Landesdenkmalamt Baden-Württemberg), at a total cost of 120,000 DM. Another renovation took place in 2017–2018.

The Kriegsberg Tower was named "Monument of the Month" in January 2019 by the Baden-Württemberg Monument Foundation (Denkmalstiftung Baden-Württemberg).

== Literature ==
- Paul Sauer: Hundert Jahre Kriegsbergturm. Stuttgart und sein Verschönerungsverein. Stuttgart : Verschönerungsverein Stuttgart, 1996.
- Manfred Schempp: Kleine Geschichte der Stuttgarter Aussichtstürme. In: Petra Kiedaisch (ed.): Türme sind Träume. Der Killesbergturm von Jörg Schlaich. With an essay by Christoph Hackelsberger. av-Edition, Ludwigsburg 2001, ISBN 3-929638-51-7, pp. 18–25, Kriegsbergturm. pp. 21–22.
- Annette Schmidt: Ludwig Eisenlohr. Ein architektonischer Weg vom Historismus zur Moderne. Stuttgarter Architektur um 1900. Stuttgart-Hohenheim 2006, pp. 321–323.
- Hermann Götz: Der Verschönerungsverein der Stadt Stuttgart 1861 - 1936 : ein Rückblick auf 75 Jahre Arbeit für das Allgemeinwohl. Stuttgart : Scheufele, 1937, p. 29.
- Jürgen Hagel: Stuttgart vor 125 Jahren : mit einem Rückblick auf 25 Jahre Vereinsarbeit des Verschönerungsvereins der Stadt Stuttgart 1961 – 1986; Jubiläumsschrift des Verschönerungsvereins der Stadt Stuttgart e.V. anläßlich seines 125-jährigen Bestehens. Stuttgart : Scheufele, 1986, p. 50.
- Bernd Langner und Wolfgang Kress: Ausblicke nach allen Richtungen. 150 Jahre Verschönerungsverein Stuttgart e. V. 1861–2011. Mit Gedanken zur künftigen Vereinsarbeit von Erhard Bruckmann. Stuttgart : Verschönerungsverein Stuttgart, 2011, pp. 57–59, 100, 108–109, 130–131, 165–166.
