= Funkturm Stuttgart =

Communication tower

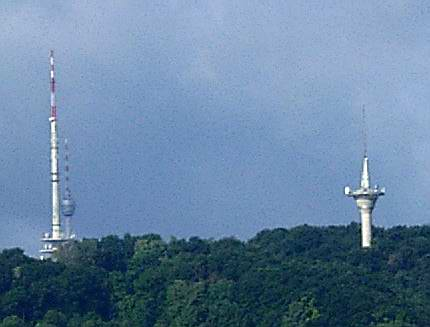
Fernmeldeturm Frauenkopf on the left and Funkturm Stuttgart on the right

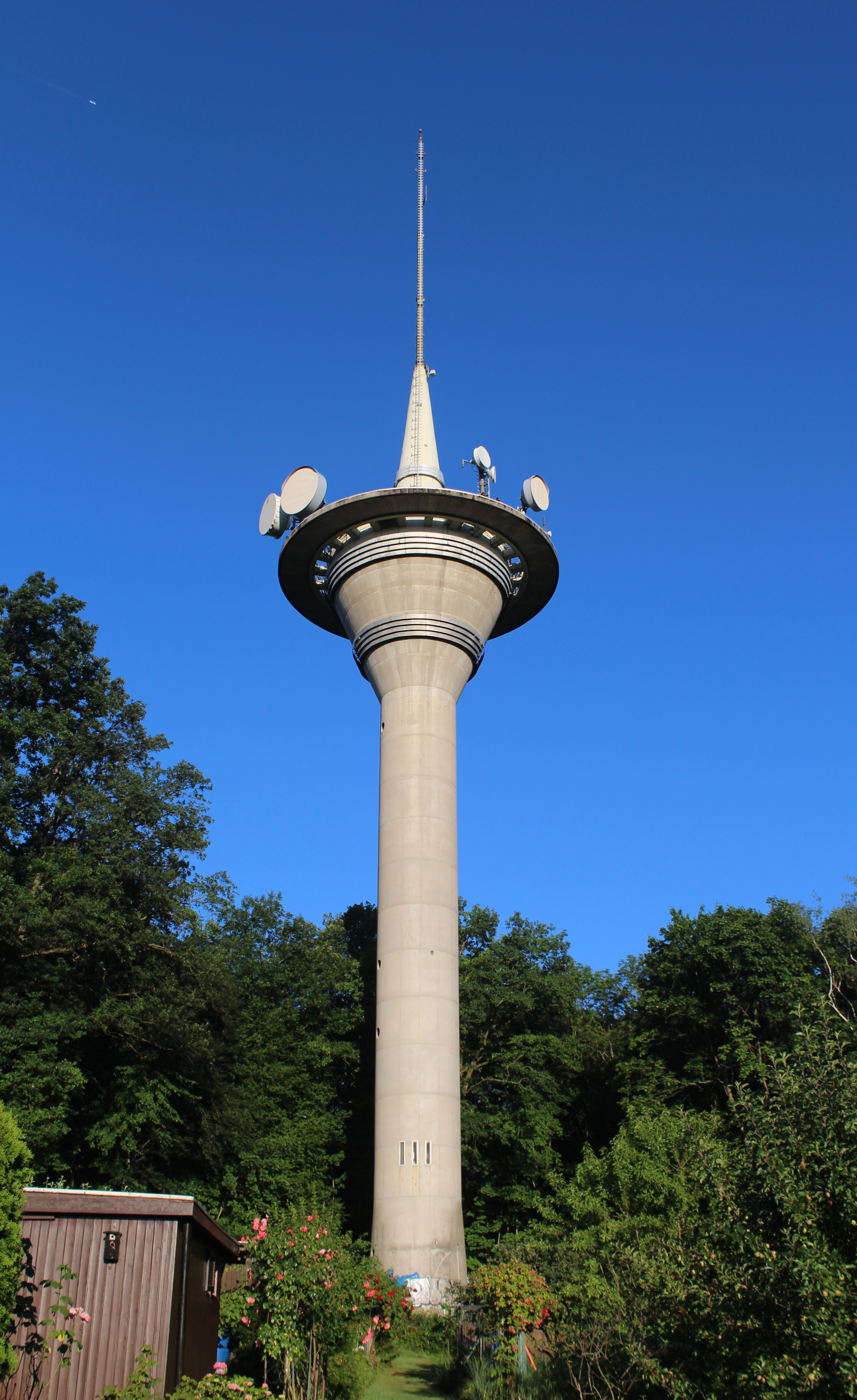
Funkturm Stuttgart

Funkturm Stuttgart is a reinforced concrete transmitting tower, built in 1966 on the Raichberg of Stuttgart, Germany (geographical coordinates: 48°46′27″N 9°13′23″E). The radio tower is not accessible to the public. It is 93 meters high and serves the police and fire-brigade radio.
