= Frauenkopf =

Coordinates: 48°46′N 9°13′E

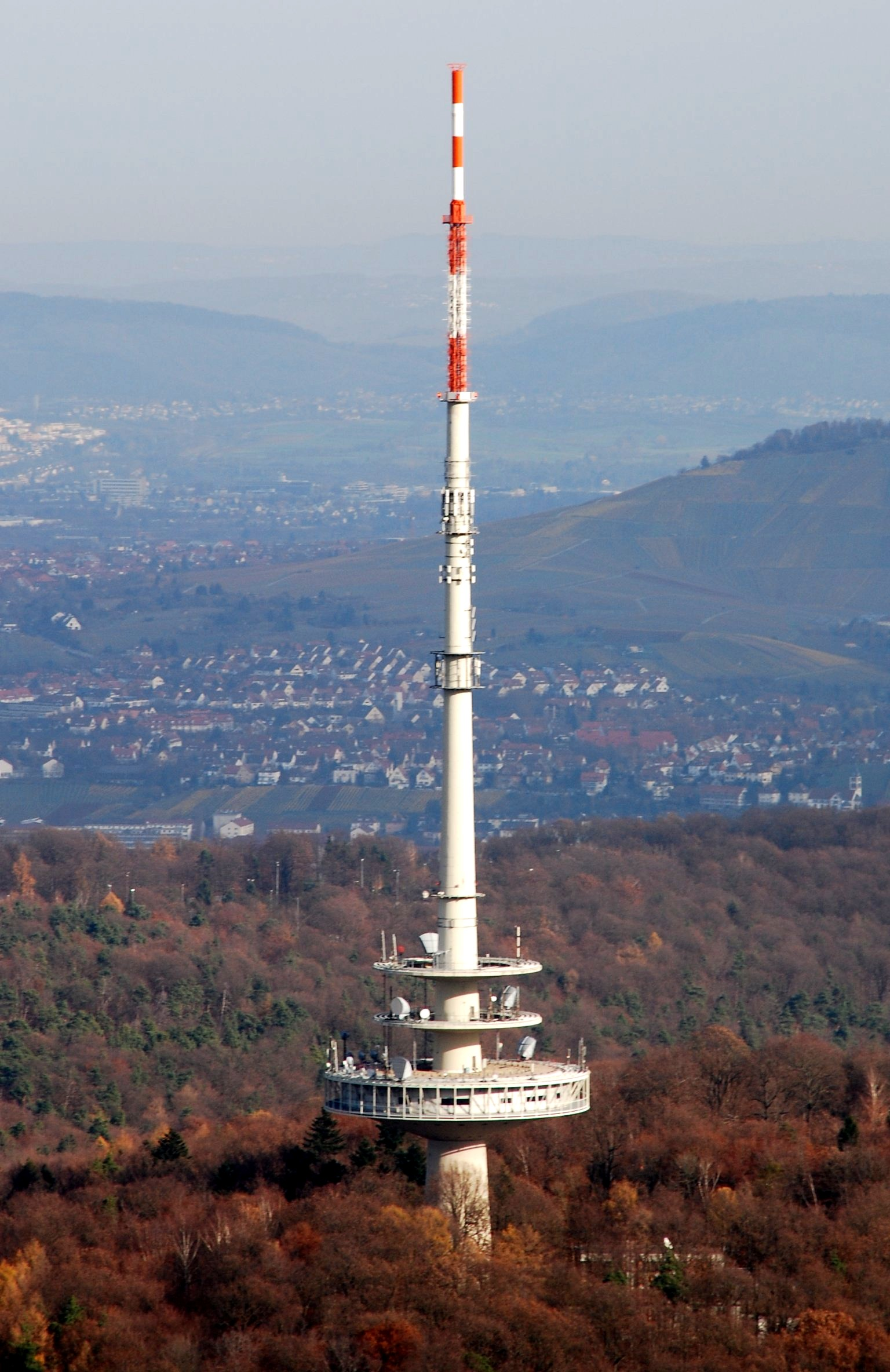
- Fernmeldeturm Stuttgart on the Frauenkopf

Highest point
- Elevation: 462 m (1,516 ft)

Naming
- English translation: Woman's Head
- Language of name: German

Geography
- Location: Baden-Württemberg, Germany

Frauenkopf is a 462m-high mountain of Stuttgart in Baden-Württemberg, Germany.

The Stuttgart telecommunications tower, Fernmeldeturm Stuttgart, is located on Frauenkopf.

It is named after a chapel dedicated to the Virgin Mary that was in the area in the early 16th century.
