= Max-Eyth-See =

Lake in Germany

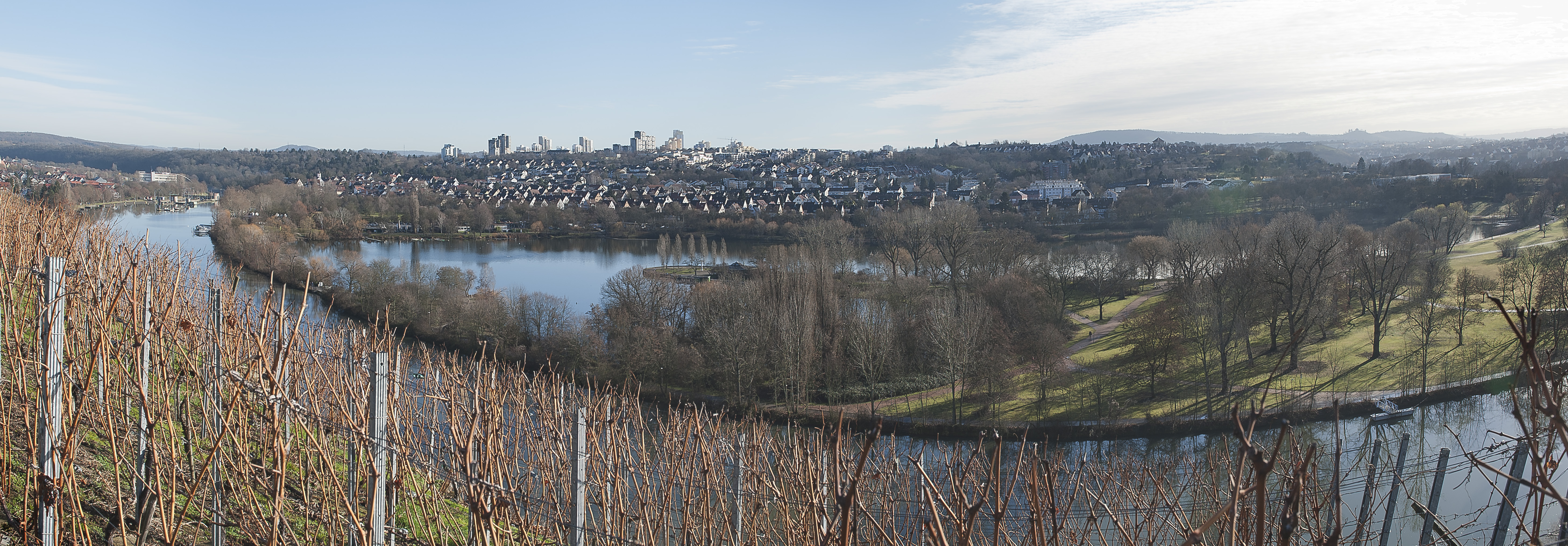

- Location within Baden-Württemberg
- Location: Stuttgart-Hofen, Baden-Württemberg
- Coordinates: 48.8353°N 9.219°E
- Primary inflows: none
- Primary outflows: Neckar
- Basin countries: Germany
- Surface area: ca. 17.3 ha (43 acres)
- Max. depth: 2.3 m (7 ft 7 in)
- Surface elevation: 214 m (702 ft)
- Settlements: Stuttgart-Hofen

Max-Eyth-See is a lake at Stuttgart-Hofen in Baden-Württemberg, Germany beside the Neckar river. It was created in 1935 by reclaiming a former gravel quarry and the lake and surrounding area have been under Landschaftsschutz (landscape protection) since 1961. It is not a full Naturschutzgebiet (NSG). The northwestern part (including artificial islands) is designated as the European bird sanctuary Special Protection Area "Bird Island Max-Eyth-See" (Natura 2000 ID DE-7121-441). At an elevation of 214 m, its surface area is approximately 17.3 ha. Nearby is a pedestrian suspension bridge across the river, the award winning Golden Gatele (officially known as the Max-Eyth-Steg).
