= Versatel building =

Former building in Stuttgart, Germany

Coordinates: 48.78409°N 9.17799°E

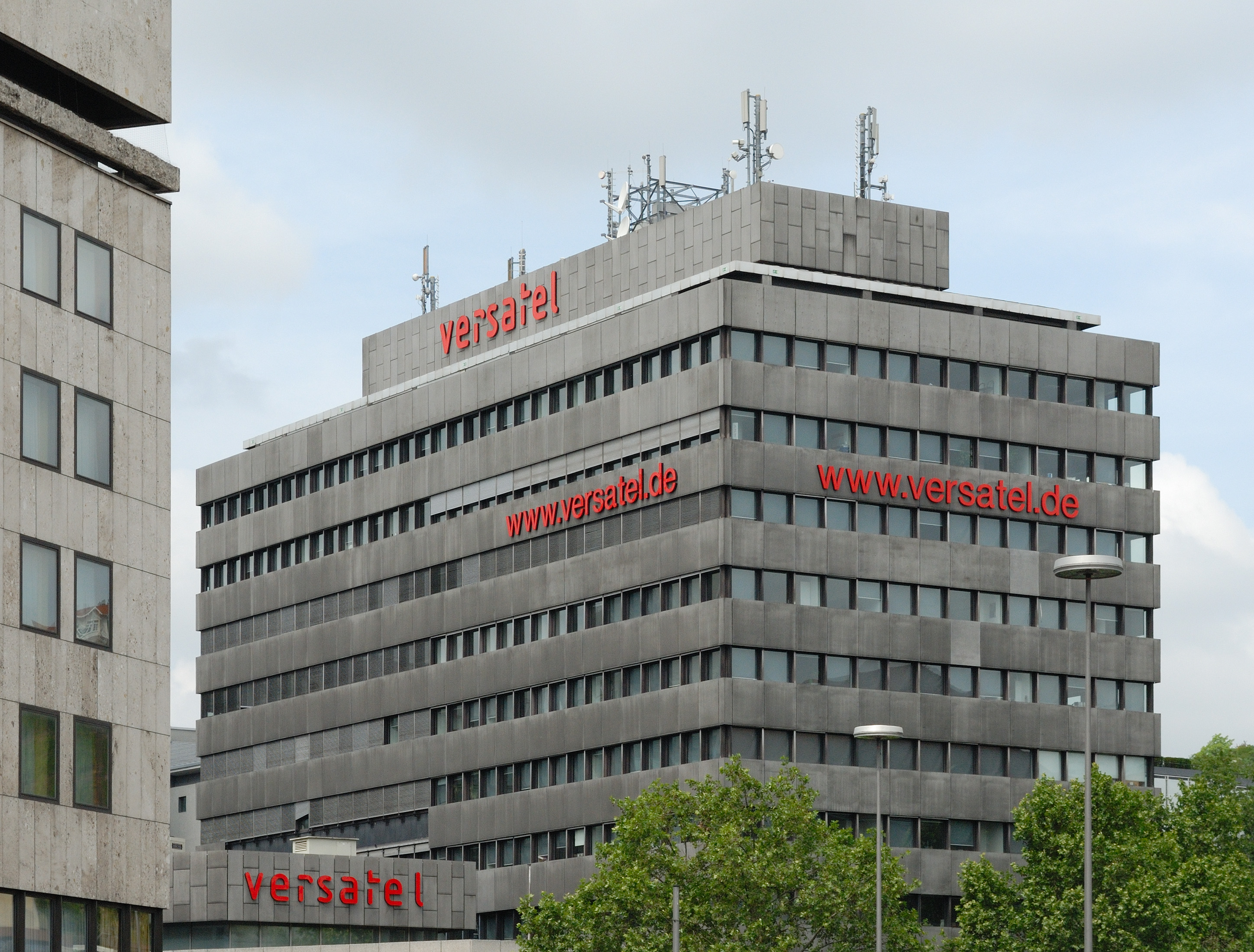
Versatel building as it appeared in 2008

The Versatel building was a building in Stuttgart which was demolished in 2011, having stood vacant for over 3 years. Stuttgart mayor Wolfgang Schuster referred to the building as an "urban sin".

The building was an office building erected in 1966, situated in central Stuttgart and consisted of 13 storeys and 3 underground storeys.

In July 2007, Carlyle Group bought the building from EnBW, with the intention of demolishing it and redeveloping the site after Versatel's lease ended in 2009. Demolition of the building began in October 2011. Schuster commented on the buildings demolition by expressing being pleased regarding the buildings demolition. The Carlyle Group plan to replace the building with an eleven-story office building, to be called "Citygate".
