= Bernhartshöhe =

Coordinates: 48°43′45″N 9°04′00″E

The carved text reads: Bernhartshöhe Höchste Erhebung Stuttgarts (highest elevation of Stuttgart) 549 m ü. NN (549 meters above Normalnull, the old German sea-level) Bürgerverein Vaihingen Rohr-Büsnau e.V. (the local civic association that placed the stone)

The Bernhartshöhe (Bernhart's heights) is an artificial mountain of 549 m (1,801 ft) in the Stuttgart-Vaihingen Part of Stuttgart, covering the southwesternmost part of the city of Stuttgart, capital of the German Bundesland (state) of Baden-Württemberg. It is the city's highest point of elevation. Bernhartshöhe is directly adjacent to the crossing of the A 8 and A 81 motorways (Autobahnkreuz Stuttgart), two crucial traffic arteries of Southern Germany. The hill is built up in th 1970s from rubble from S-Bahn and Stadtbahn tunnel work, including the Hasenberg Tunnel. The summit is a small meadow in woods with almost no view.

== Gallery ==
2012

2013

2013

2023
