= Bopser =

Coordinates: 48°45′N 9°12′E

Highest point
- Elevation: 485.2 m (1,592 ft)

Geography
- Location: Baden-Württemberg, Germany

Bopser is a mountain located in Baden-Württemberg, Germany.
