= Dinkelacker =

German beer brand

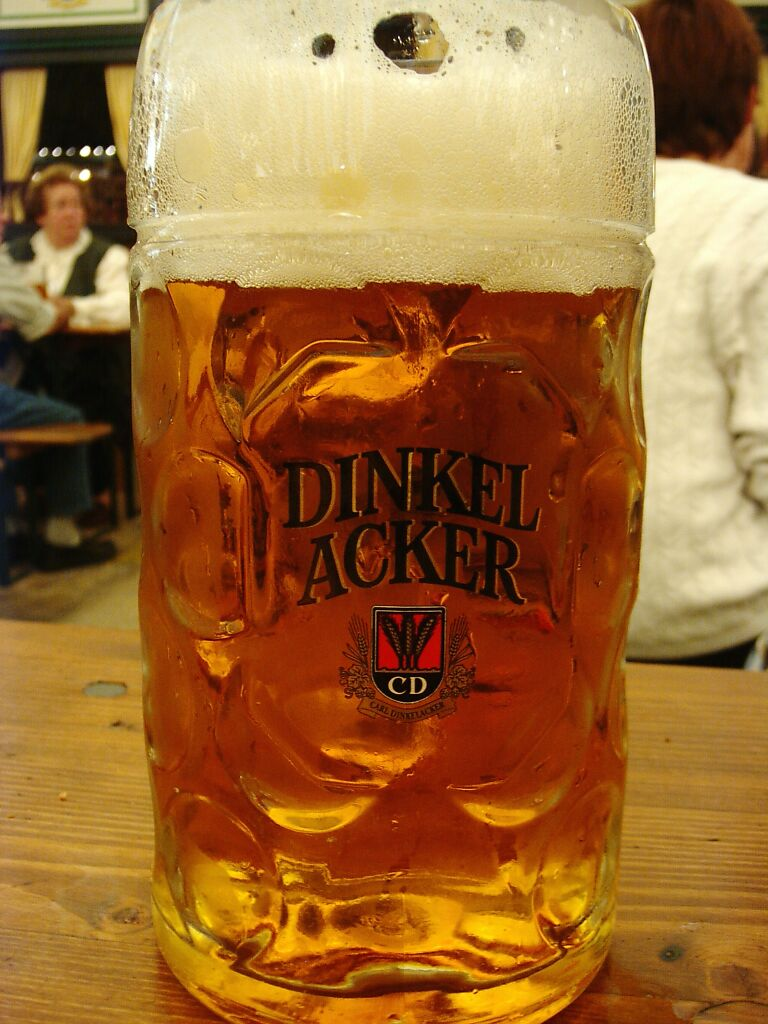
- Dinkelacker at the Stuttgart Beer Festival
- Interactive map of Dinkelacker
- Location: Stuttgart, Baden-Württemberg, Germany
- Coordinates: 48°46′5″N 9°10′14″E
- Opened: 1888
- Key people: Carl Dinkelacker
- Annual production volume: 800,000 hectolitres (680,000 US bbl) (2018)

Dinkelacker is a brand of German beer brewed in Stuttgart, Germany.

The Dinkelacker brewery was founded by Carl Dinkelacker in Stuttgart's Tübinger Straße in 1888. The company still brews at that location. By the end of the 19th century Dinkelacker was the largest brewery in Stuttgart.

Dinkelacker is German for "field of spelt".

== See also ==
- Beer festival
