= Fernmeldeturm Stuttgart =

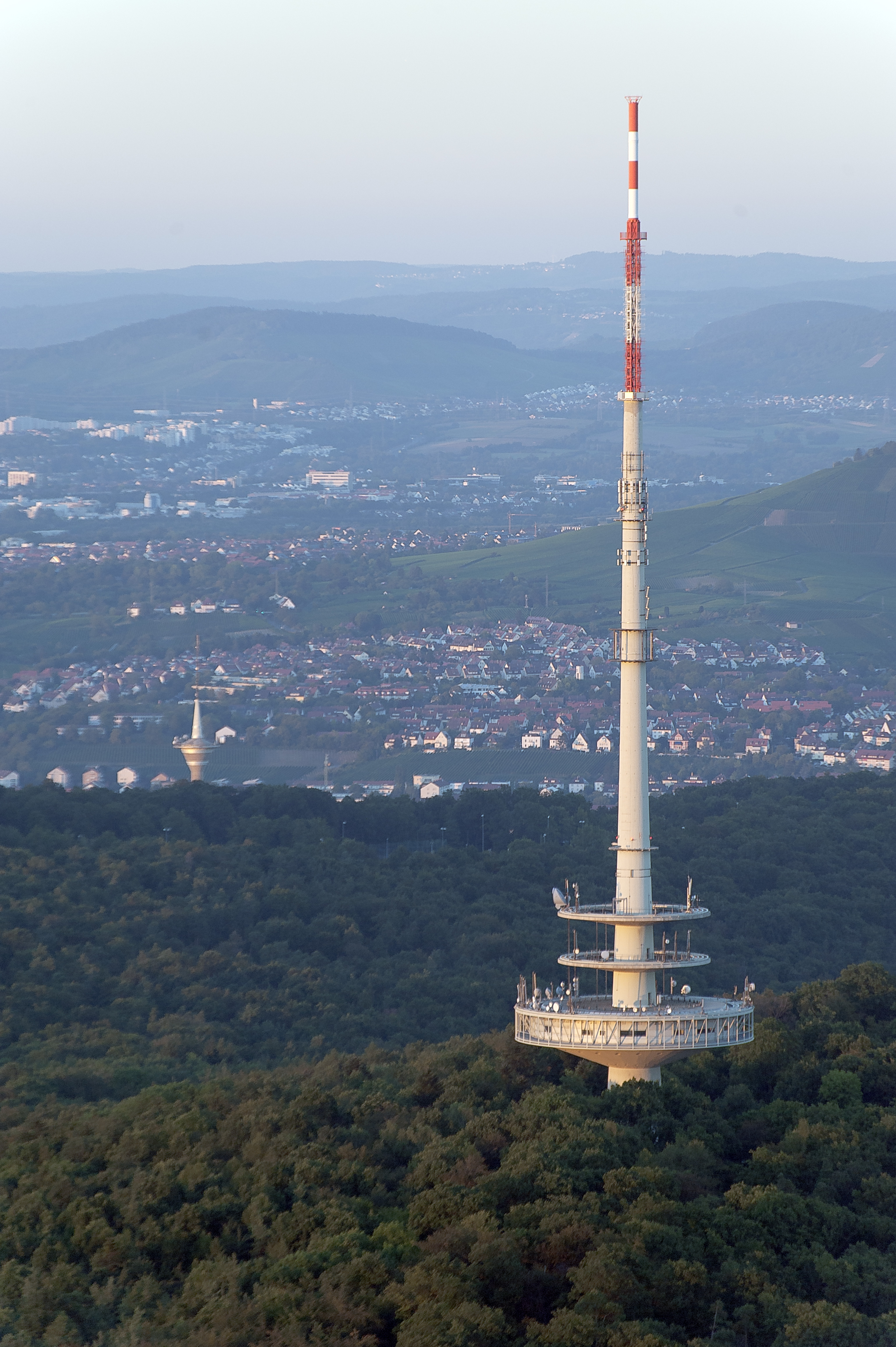
Fernmeldeturm Stuttgart

The Stuttgarter Fernmeldeturm (Stuttgart Telecommunication Tower) is a reinforced concrete tower for radio relay, FM, and TV transmitting services at Stuttgart-Frauenkopf in Germany (Geographical coordinates: 48°45′53″N 9°12′26″E). Unlike the Stuttgart TV tower, it is not accessible to the public. It belongs to Deutsche Telekom and is 192.4 metres high. The tower has an operations room with a diameter of 40.6 meters at a height of 33.78 metres.

== History ==
The tower was built between 1970 and 1972, replacing an outdated predecessor from 1954. The earlier tower supported microwave radio communications for Deutsche Bundespost and, from 1960, radio communication for the early mobile phone network A-Netz. The new tower was designed by Leonhardt, Andrä & Partner and was built by Siemens-Bauunion GmbH, Wayss & Freytag AG. As well as microwave and mobile radio networks, the new tower supports broadcast radio and television and, since 2006, digital television (DVB-T) programs.

== See also ==
- List of towers
- List of masts

== Sources ==
1. Schlaich, Jörg, Schüller, Matthias, Ingenieurbauführer Baden-Württemberg, ISBN 9783934369016, page 489–490. # concrete and reinforced concrete construction, number 4/1971
2. Telecommunications Tower on the Frauenkopf at Structurae
3. Picture on Google-Maps
