= Stuttgart =

Capital of Baden-Württemberg, Germany

Stuttgart Schduagert (Swabian) Stuttgart (Alemannic German)
- City
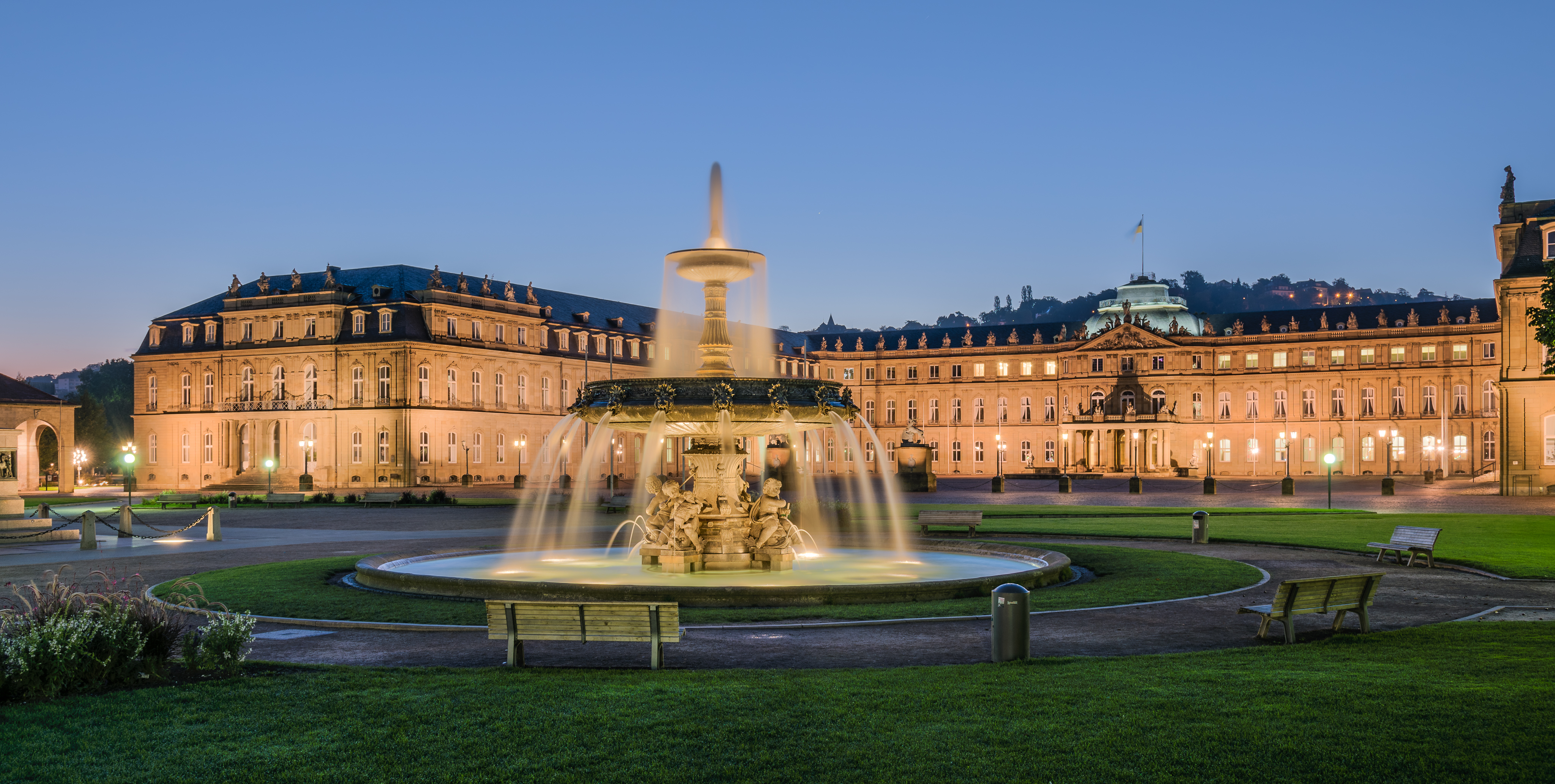
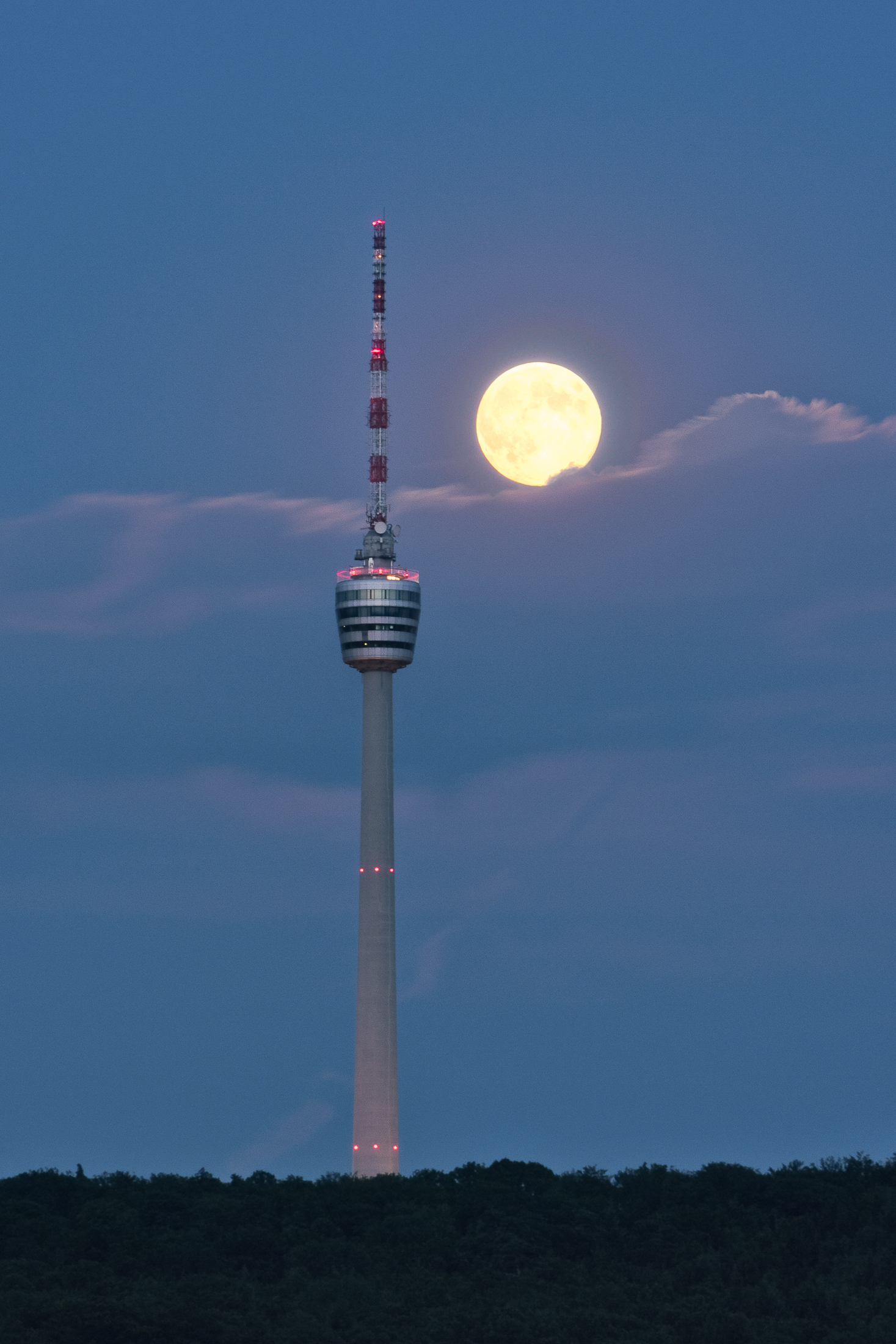
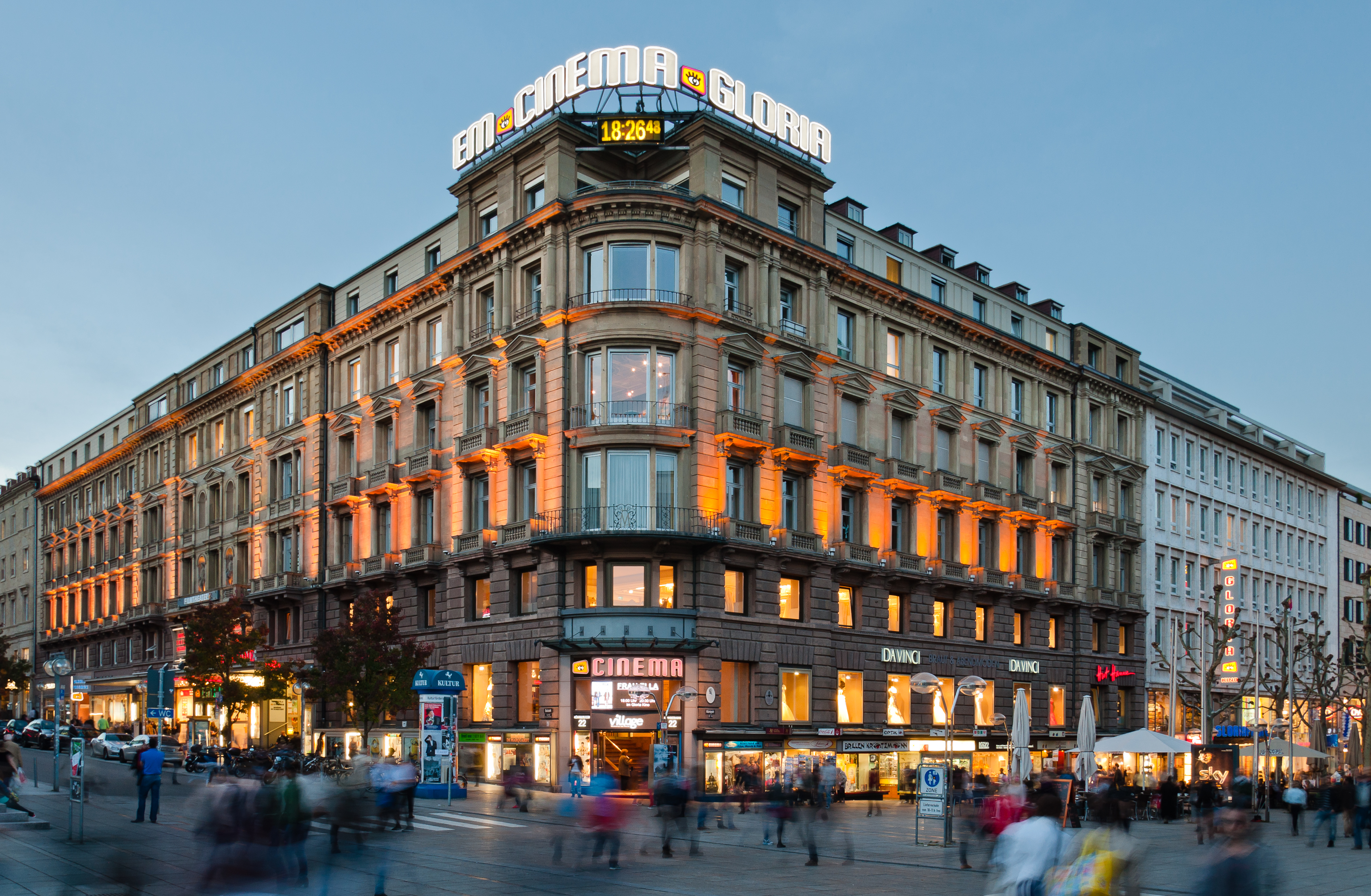
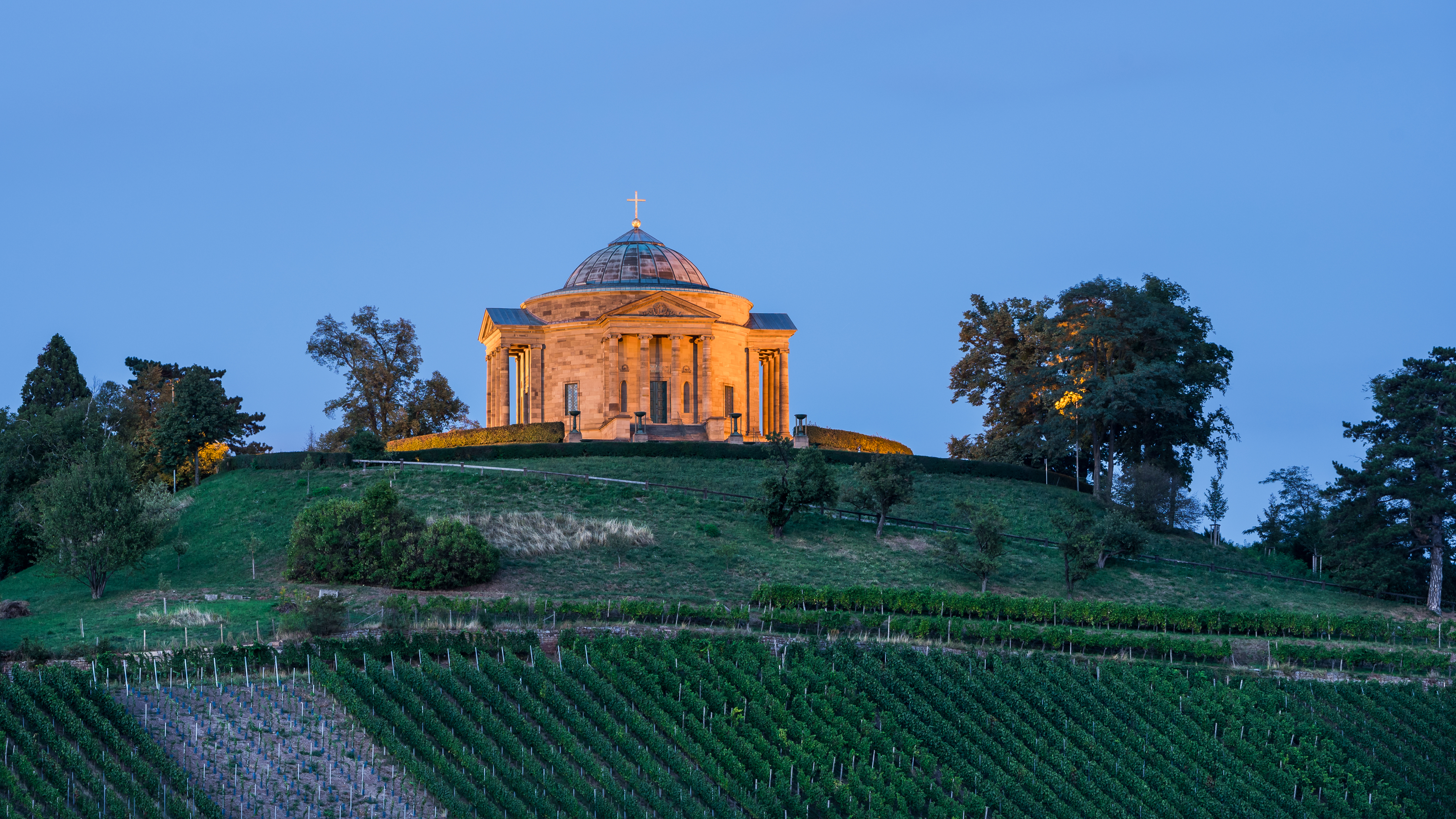
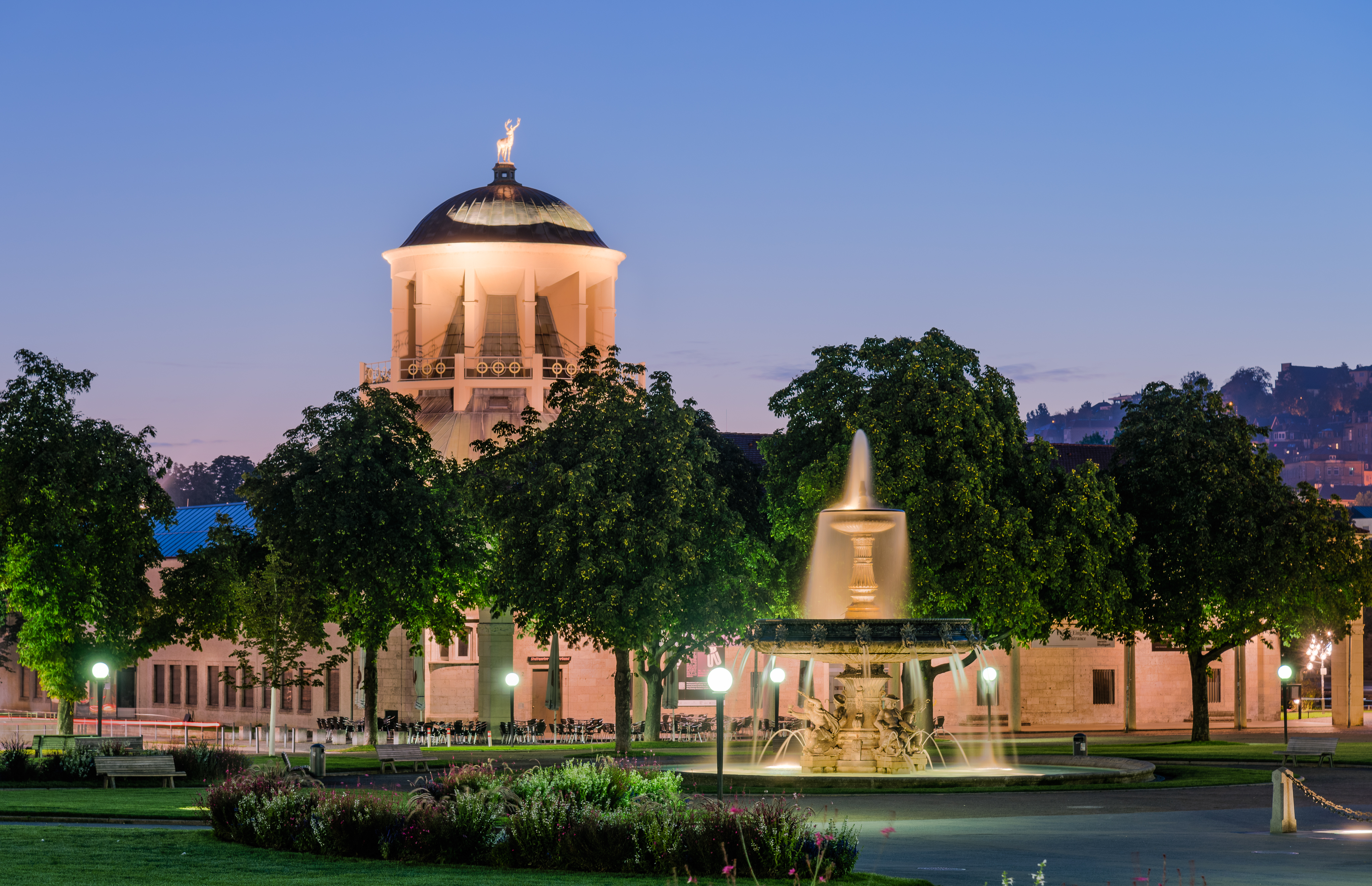
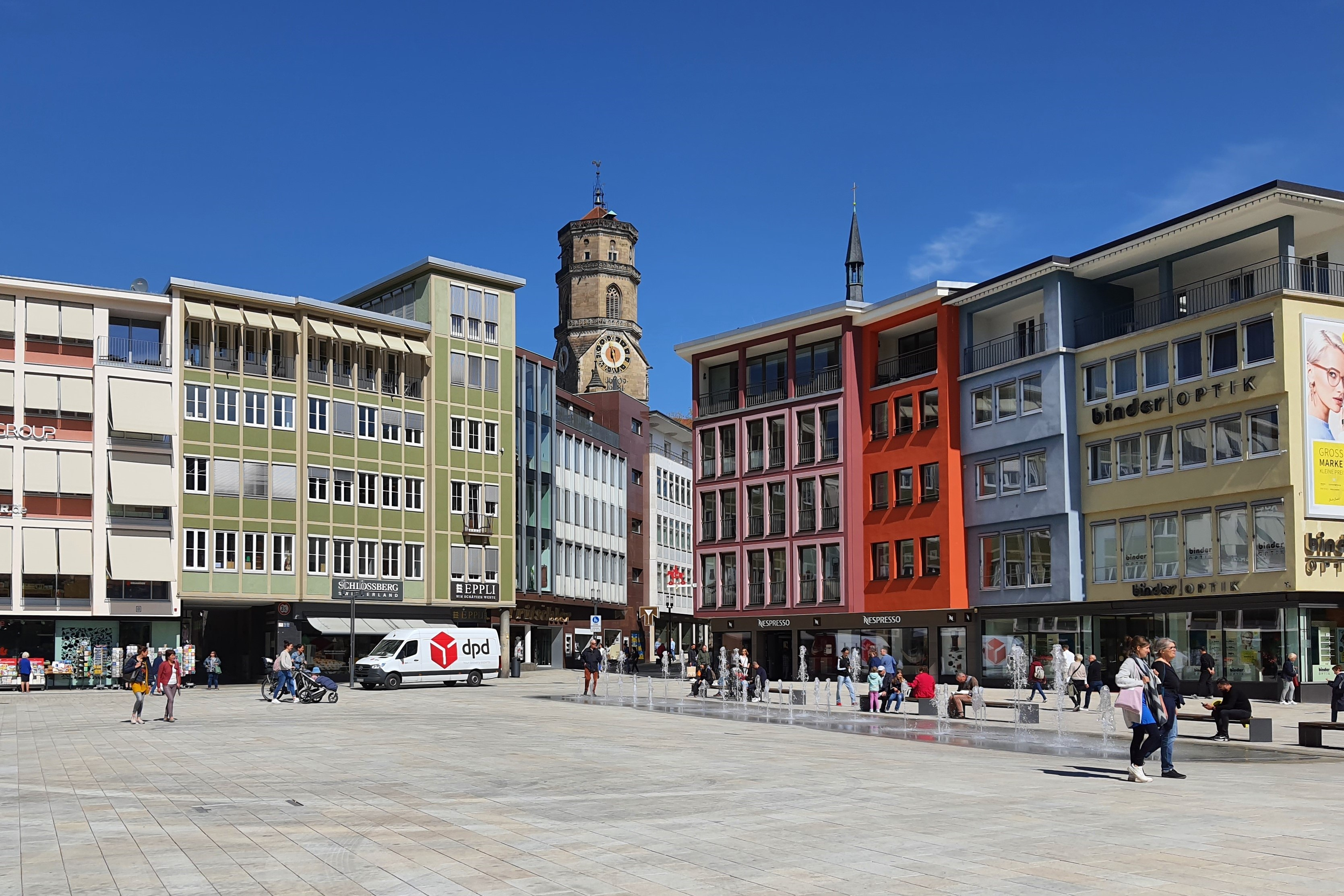
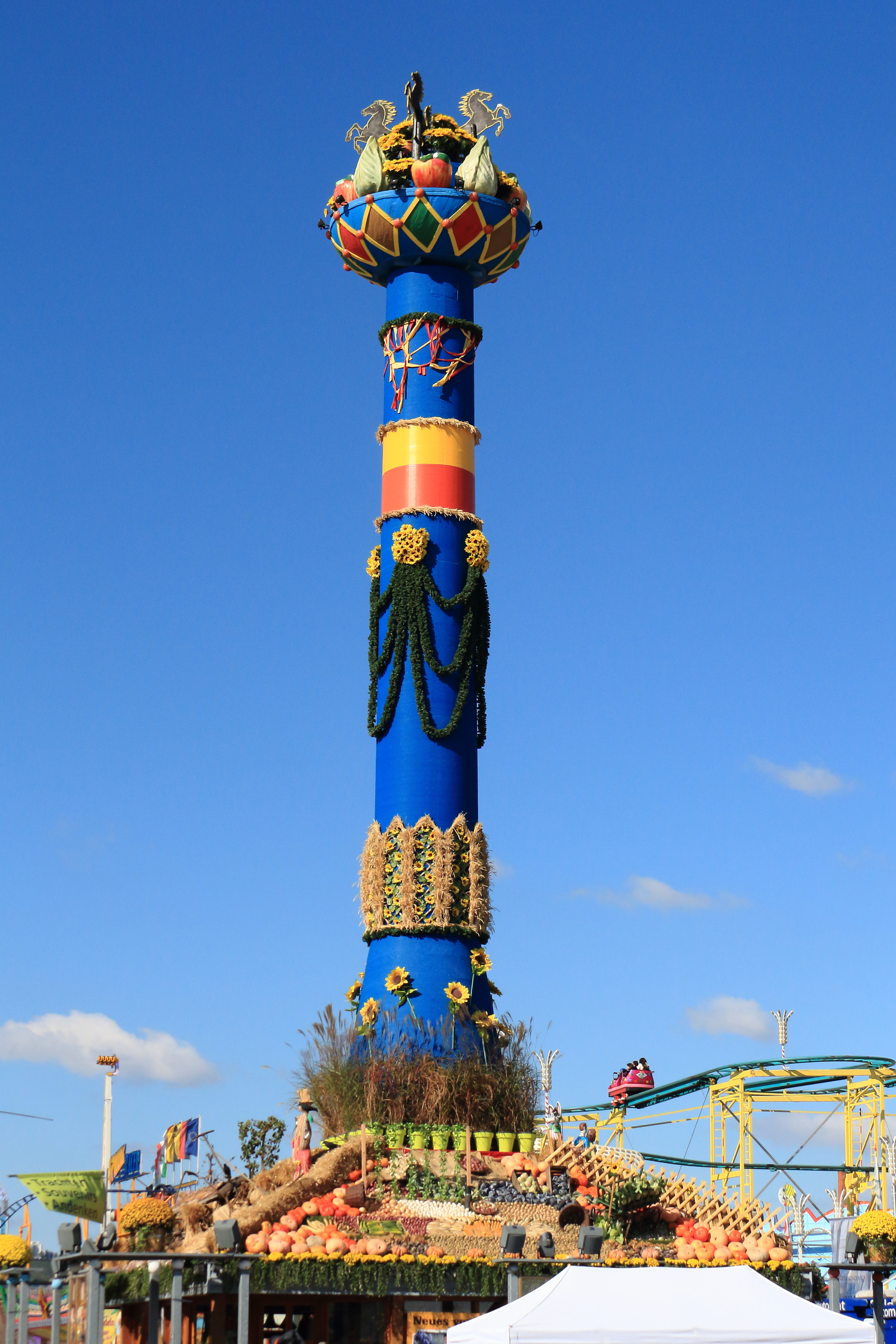
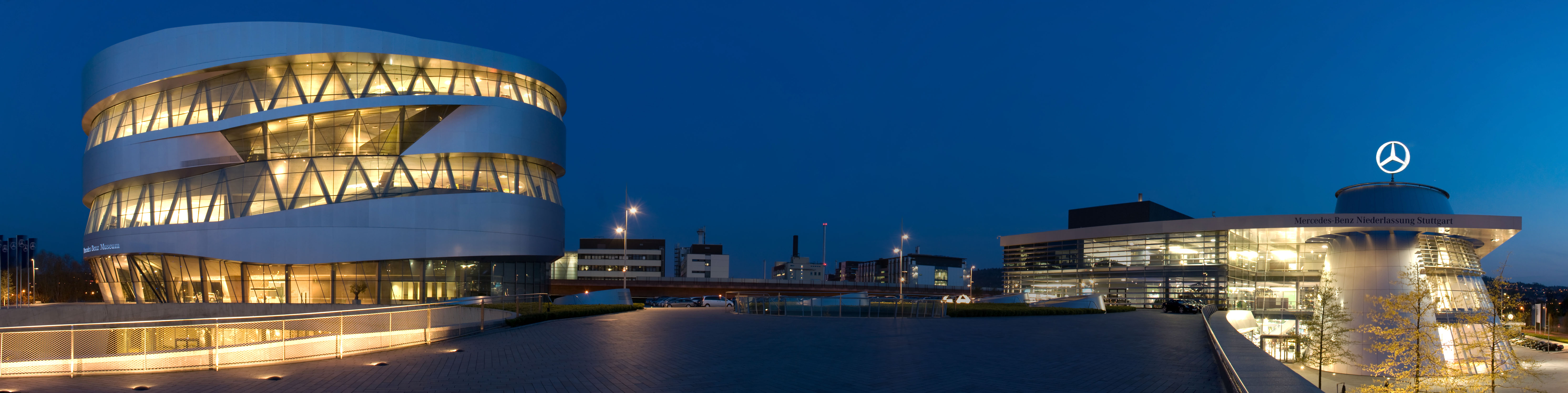
- Castle Square with New Palace TV Tower Marquardtbau Mount Württemberg Kunstgebäude Market Square Cannstatt Wasen Mercedes-Benz Welt

- Flag Coat of arms

- Location within Baden-Württemberg
- Interactive map of Stuttgart
- Location within Germany Location within Baden-Württemberg
- Coordinates: 48°46′39″N 09°10′48″E
- Country: Germany
- State: Baden-Württemberg
- Admin. region: Stuttgart
- District: Stadtkreis
- Founded: 10th century
- Subdivisions: 23 districts

Government
  - Mayor (2020–28): Frank Nopper (CDU)

Area
  - City: 207.33 km^{2} (80.05 sq mi)
- Elevation: 245 m (804 ft)

Population (2025-12-31)
  - City: 609,365
  - Density: 2,939.1/km^{2} (7,612.3/sq mi)
  - Urban: 2,787,727 (31 Dec 2018)
  - Metro: 5,465,093 (2021)
- Demonym: Stuttgarter
- Time zone: UTC+01:00 (CET)
  - Summer (DST): UTC+02:00 (CEST)
- Postal codes: 70173–70619
- Dialling codes: 0711
- Vehicle registration: S
- Website: stuttgart.de

Stuttgart (/ˈstʌtɡɑːrt, ˈstʊt-/; German: [ˈʃtʊtɡaʁt]; Swabian: Schduagert [ˈʃd̥ua̯ɡ̊ɛʕd̥]; Alemannic: Stuttgart; names in other languages) is the capital and largest city of the German state of Baden-Württemberg. It is located on the Neckar river in a fertile valley known as the Stuttgarter Kessel (Stuttgart Cauldron) and lies an hour from the Swabian Jura and the Black Forest. Stuttgart has a population of 613,111 as of 2023, making it the sixth largest city in Germany, while over 2.8 million people live in the city's administrative region and nearly 5.5 million people live in its metropolitan area, making it the fourth largest metropolitan area in Germany. The city's metropolitan area is consistently ranked among the top 5 European metropolitan areas by GDP. Mercer listed Stuttgart as 21st on its 2015 list of cities by quality of living; (Note: Sixth in Germany behind Munich, Düsseldorf, Frankfurt, Berlin, and Hamburg) innovation agency 2thinknow ranked the city 22nd globally out of 441 cities in its Innovation Cities Index; (Note: 10th in Europe and third in Germany, behind Munich and Berlin) and the Globalization and World Cities Research Network ranked the city as a Beta-status global city in their 2020 survey. Stuttgart was one of the host cities for the official tournaments of the 1974 and 2006 FIFA World Cups.

Stuttgart is spread across a variety of hills (some of them covered in vineyards), valleys (especially around the Neckar and the Stuttgart basin) and parks. The city is known as the "cradle of the automobile". As such, it is home to famous automobile museums like the Mercedes-Benz Museum and Porsche Museum, as well as numerous auto-enthusiast magazines, which contributes to Stuttgart's status as Germany's "Autohauptstadt" ("car capital city"/"capital of cars"). The city's tourism slogan is "Stuttgart offers more". Under current plans to improve transport links to the international infrastructure (as part of the Stuttgart 21 project), Stuttgart unveiled a new city logo and slogan in March 2008, describing itself as "Das neue Herz Europas" ("The new Heart of Europe"). For business, it describes itself as "Where business meets the future". In July 2010, the city unveiled a new logo, designed to entice more businesspeople to stay in the city and enjoy breaks in the area.

Since the seventh millennium BC, the Stuttgart area has been an important agricultural area and has been host to a number of cultures seeking to utilize the rich soil of the Neckar valley. The Roman Empire conquered the area in AD 83 and built a massive castrum near Bad Cannstatt, making it the most important regional centre for several centuries. Stuttgart's roots were truly laid in the tenth century with its founding by Liudolf, Duke of Swabia, as a stud farm for his warhorses. Initially overshadowed by nearby Bad Cannstatt, the town grew steadily and was granted a charter in 1320. The fortunes of Stuttgart turned with those of the House of Württemberg, and they made it the capital of their county, duchy, and kingdom from the 15th century to 1918. Stuttgart prospered despite setbacks in the Thirty Years' War and devastating air raids by the Allies on the city and its automobile production during World War II. However, by 1952, the city had bounced back and became the major cultural, economic, industrial, financial, tourism and publishing centre it is today.

Stuttgart is known for its strong high-tech industry, especially in the automotive sector. It has the highest general standard of prosperity of any German city. In addition to many medium-sized companies, several major corporations are headquartered in Stuttgart, including Porsche, Bosch, Exyte, and Mercedes-Benz Group. Stuttgart is an important financial center; the Stuttgart Stock Exchange is the second largest in Germany (after Frankfurt), and the Landesbank Baden-Württemberg (LBBW) is Germany's largest Landesbank. Stuttgart is also a major transport junction; it is among the most congested conurbations of Europe, and its airport is the sixth-busiest in Germany (2019). Stuttgart is a city with a high number of immigrants; according to Dorling Kindersley's Eyewitness Travel Guide to Germany, "In the city of Stuttgart, every third inhabitant is a foreigner." 40% of Stuttgart's residents, and 64% of the population below the age of five, are of immigrant background. In the rest of Germany, 28.7% of people are of immigrant background, with a relatively higher percentage living in cities and the former western Germany (such as Stuttgart).

== Etymology ==
Stuttgart, often nicknamed the "Schwabenmetropole" (English: Swabian metropolis) in reference to its location in the centre of Swabia and the local dialect spoken by the native Swabians, has its etymological roots in the Old High German word Stuotgarten, or "stud farm", because the city was founded in 950 AD by Duke Liudolf of Swabia to breed warhorses.

In the local dialects of Alemannic German it can be "Schtuegert", and in Swabian German "Stuagart"; with similar variant spellings, usually dropping the central T sound.

== History ==
Historical affiliations

- Roman Empire 83–475
- Kingdom of Alamannia c. 475–911
- Duchy of Swabia 915–1313
- Duchy of Württemberg 1495–1803
- Electorate of Württemberg 1803–1805
- Kingdom of Württemberg 1805–1918
- German Empire 1871–1918
- Weimar Republic 1918–1933
- Nazi Germany 1933–1945
- Allied-occupied Germany 1945–1949
- West Germany 1949–1990
- Germany 1990–present

=== Antiquity ===
Originally, the most important location in the Neckar river valley was the hilly rim of the Stuttgart basin at what is today Bad Cannstatt. Thus, the first settlement of Stuttgart was a massive Roman Castra stativa (Cannstatt Castrum) built c. 90 AD to protect the vineyards blanketing the landscape and the road from Mogontiacum (now Mainz) to Augusta Vindelicorum (Augsburg). Cannstatt was a part of the Roman imperial province Germania Superior.

As with many military installations, settlement sprang up nearby and remained there even after the limes moved further east. When they did, the town was left in the capable hands of a local brickwork that produced sophisticated architectural ceramics and pottery. When the Romans were driven back past the Rhine and Danube rivers in the third century by the Alamanni, the settlement temporarily vanished from history until the seventh century.

=== Middle Ages ===
Archaeological evidence shows that later Merovingian era Frankish farmers continued to till the same land the Romans did.

Cannstatt is mentioned in the Abbey of St. Gall's archives as "Canstat ad Neccarum" (German: Cannstatt-on-Neckar) in 708. The etymology of the name "Cannstatt" is not clear, but as the site is mentioned as condistat in the Annals of Metz (9th century), it is mostly derived from the Latin word condita ("foundation"), suggesting that the name of the Roman settlement might have had the prefix "Condi-". Alternatively, Sommer (1992) suggested that the Roman site corresponds to the Civitas Aurelia G attested to in an inscription found near Öhringen. There have also been attempts at a derivation from a Gaulish *kondâti- "confluence".

In AD 950, Duke Liudolf of Swabia, son of the current Holy Roman Emperor Otto I, decided to establish a stud farm for his cavalry during the Hungarian invasions of Europe on the Nesenbach river valley 5 km (3.1 mi) south of the old Roman castrum. The land and title of Duke of Swabia remained in Liudolf's hands until his rebellion was quashed by his father four years later. In 1089, Bruno of Calw built the precursor building to the Old Castle.

Stuttgart's viticulture, first documented in the Holy Roman Empire in the year AD 1108, kept people in the area of that stud farm for some time, but the area was still largely overshadowed by nearby Cannstatt because of its role as a local crossroad for many major European trade routes. Nevertheless, the existence of a settlement here (despite the terrain being more suited for raising horses) during the High Middle Ages is provided by a gift registry from Hirsau Abbey dated to around 1160 that mentions a "Hugo de Stuokarten". A settlement at this locale was again mentioned in 1229, but this time by Pope Gregory IX. In AD 1219, Stuttgart (then Stuotgarten) became a possession of Herman V, Margrave of Baden. In addition to Backnang, Pforzheim, and Besigheim, Hermann would also found the Stuttgart we know today in c. 1220. In 1251, the city passed to the Ulrich I von Württemberg as part of Mechthild von Baden's dowry. His son, Eberhard I "the Illustrious", would be the first to begin the many major expansions of Stuttgart under the House of Württemberg.

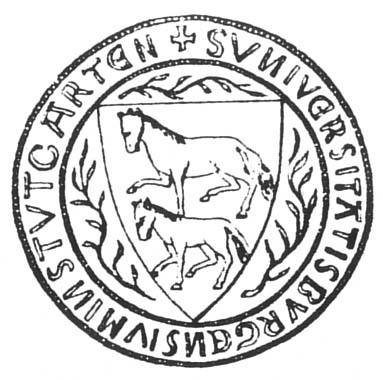
Stuttgart's first coat of arms (1286) (Note: The history of Stuttgart's coat of arms is long. The Chorographia Württemberg of 1591 shows a horse rampant facing sinister on a field argent. Siebmachers Wappenbuch of 1605 (p. 225) has the modern coat of arms, with the horse facing dexter, on a field or. The modern design of this coat of arms dates to 1938 (and was also adopted as part of the Porsche logo in 1952).)

Eberhard desired to expand the realm his father had built through military action with the aid of the anti-king Henry Raspe IV, Landgrave of Thuringia, but was thwarted by the action of Emperor Rudolph I. Further resistance by Eberhard I against the Emperor's created Vogts and Bailiwicks as well as the newly appointed Duke of Swabia Rudolf II, Duke of Austria, eventually led to armed conflict and initial successes upon Emperor Rudolph I's death in 1291 against the Emperor's men. After initially defeating his regional rivals, Henry VII, newly elected as Emperor, decided to take action against Eberhard I in 1311 during his war with the Free imperial city of Esslingen by ordering his Vogt, Konrad IV von Weinberg, to declare war on Eberhard I. Eberhard I, defeated on the battlefield, lost Stuttgart and his castle (razed in 1311) to Esslingen and the city was thus managed by the city state from 1312 to 1315. Total destruction of the county was prevented by Henry VII's death on 24 August 1313 and the elections of Louis IV as King of the Germans and Frederick III as anti-king. Eberhard seized the opportunity granted to him by the political chaos, and recaptured his hometown and birthplace in 1316, and made much territorial gain. With peace restored at last, Eberhard began repairs and expansion to Stuttgart beginning with the reconstruction of Wirtemberg Castle, ancestral home to the House of Württemberg, in 1351 and then began expansion of the city's defenses. 1371 were important years for Stuttgart: Eberhard I moved the seat of the county to the city to a new and expanded castle, the collegiate church in Beutelsbach, where previous members of the Württemberg dynasty had been buried prior to its destruction in 1311, moved to its current location in Stuttgart in 1320, and the town's Stiftkirche was expanded into an abbey, and the control of the Martinskirche by the Bishopric of Constance was broken by Papal order in 1321. A year after the city became the principal seat of the Counts of Württemberg in 1320, the city was granted status as a city and given civic rights. At the end of the 14th century, new suburbs sprang up around Leonhard Church and near the city's fortifications as well. Towards the end of the 15th century, Count Ulrich V began construction of a new suburb on the northeastern edge of the city around the Dominican monastery Hospitalkirche. In the 1457, the first Landtag of the Estates of Württemberg was established in Stuttgart and a similar institution was established in Leonberg. After the temporary partitions of the County of Württemberg by the Treaties of Nürtingen, Münsingen, and Esslingen, Stuttgart was once again declared the capital of the county in 1483.

=== Early Modern era ===
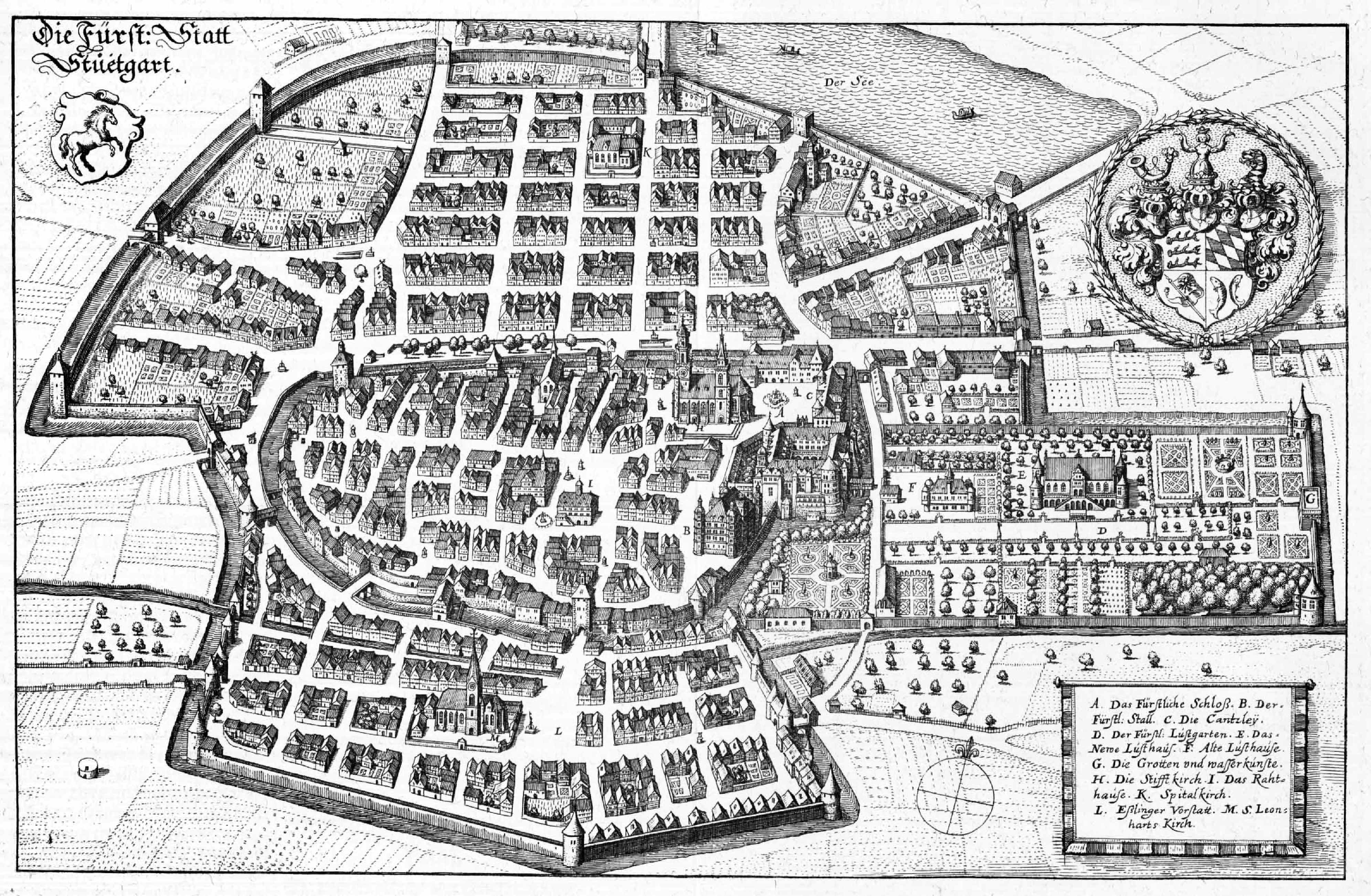
1634 Drawing of Stuttgart by Matthäus Merian

In 1488, Stuttgart officially became the de facto residence of the Count himself as opposed to the location of his home, the Old Castle. Eberhard I, then Count Eberhard V, became the first Duke of Württemberg (Note: This type of sovereign royal duke was known in Germany as a Herzog.) in 1495, and made Stuttgart the seat of the Duchy of Württemberg in addition to the County thereof. All this would be lost to the Württembergs during the reign of his son, Ulrich. Though Ulrich initially made territorial gains as a result of his decision to fight alongside the Emperor Maximilian I, he was no friend of the powerful Swabian League nor of his own subjects, who launched the Poor Conrad rebellion of 1514. Despite this and his rivalry with the Swabian League, his undoing would actually come in the form of his unhappy marriage to Sabina of Bavaria. In 1515, Ulrich killed an imperial knight and lover of Sabina's by the name of Hans von Hutten, obliging her to flee to the court of her brother, William IV, Duke of Bavaria, who successfully had Ulrich placed under Imperial ban twice. When the Emperor died in 1519, Ulrich struck, seizing the Free Imperial City of Reutlingen, prompting the League to intervene. That same year, Ulrich was soundly defeated and he was driven into exile in France and Switzerland following the League's conquest of Württemberg. Württemberg was then sold by the League to Emperor Charles V, who then granted it to his brother, Ferdinand I, thus beginning the 12 year ownership of the county by the Habsburgs. When the peasants Ulrich had crushed before rose once again in the German Peasants' War, Stuttgart was occupied by the peasant armies for a few days in the Spring of 1525. Ulrich, with the help of Philip I, Landgrave of Hesse, seized the chance to restore himself to power (albeit as an Austrian vassal) in the turmoil of the Reformation and War with the Turks and invited Erhard Schnepf to bring the Reformation to Stuttgart. He accepted, was named Court Preacher in Stuttgart, and worked in concert with Ambrosius Blarer until his dismissal following his resistance to the Augsburg Interim by the Duke in 1548. Duke Ulrich himself died two years later, and was succeeded by his son, Christoph. He had grown up in a Württemberg in turmoil and wished to rebuild its image. To this end, he once again began a construction boom all over the Duchy under the direction of Court Architect Aberlin Tretsch; knowing full well that the time of the Reisekönigtum was over, Christoph and Tretsch rebuilt and remodeled the Old Castle into a Renaissance palace, and from 1542 to 1544, what is today the Schillerplatz was built as a town square. Duke Christoph also responded to the increasing need for drinking water by embarking upon a massive hydraulic engineering project in the form of a 2,810 ft (860 m) tunnel to Pffaf Lake, the Glems, and the Nesenbach from 1566 to 1575. In 1575, Georg Beer was also appointed Court Architect, and he built the Lusthaus. But it was architect Heinrich Schickhardt who would carry Tretsch's torch further; Schickhardt constructed the Stammheim Castle in the suburb of Stammheim, rebuilt the Fruchtkasten in the today's Schillerplatz, and expanded the Prinzebau.

The Thirty Years' War devastated the city, and it would slowly decline for a period of time from then on. After the catastrophic defeat of the Protestant Heilbronn League by the Habsburgs at Nörlingen in 1634, Duke Eberhard III and his court fled in exile to Strasbourg, abandoning the Duchy to looting by pro-Habsburg forces. The Habsburgs once again had full reign of the city for another four years, and in that time Stuttgart had to carry the burden of billeting the pro-Habsburg armies in Swabia. Ferdinand III, King of the Romans, entered the city in 1634 and, two years later in 1636, once again attempted to re-Catholicize Württemberg. The next year, the Bubonic plague struck and devastated the population. The Duke returned in 1638 to a realm somewhat partitioned to Catholic factions in the region, and entirely ravaged by the war. In the Duchy itself, battle, famine, plague and war reduced the Duchy's population of 350,000 in 1618 to 120,000 in 1648 – about 57% of the population of Württemberg. Recovery would be slow for the next several decades, but began nonetheless with the city's first bookstore in 1650 and high school in 1686. This progress was almost entirely undone when French soldiers under Ezéchiel du Mas appeared outside the city's walls in 1688 during the Nine Years' War, but the city was saved from another sack due to the diplomatic ability of Magdalena Sibylla, reigning over Württemberg as regent for her son, Eberhard Ludwig.

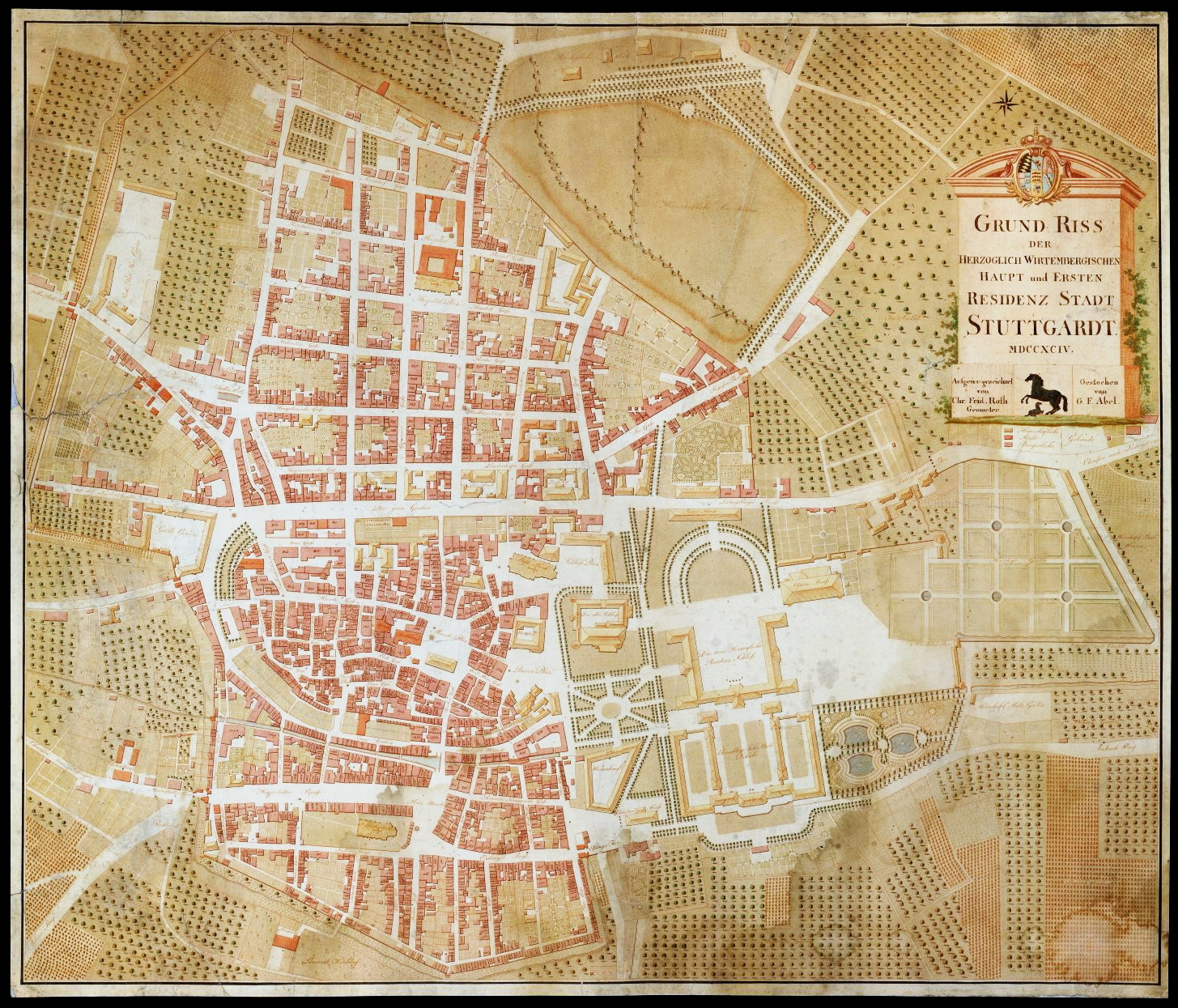
Drawing of Stuttgart, 1794

For the first time in 1654, Duke Eberhard Ludwig moved the seat of the Duchy out of the declining city of Stuttgart in 1718 to Ludwigsburg, founded in 1704, while the namesake Baroque palace, known as the "Versailles of Swabia", was still under construction. When Eberhard Ludwig died, his nephew Charles Alexander, ascended to the throne. Charles Alexander himself died in 1737, meaning his son Charles Eugene became the premature Duke (and later King) at the age of nine. When he came of age and returned from his tutoring at the court of Frederick the Great, King of Prussia, Charles desired to move the capital back to Stuttgart. He commissioned the construction of the New Castle in 1746, Castle Solitude in 1763, Castle Hohenheim in 1785, and the Karlsschule in 1770. The rule of Charles Eugene also saw the tutoring and origins of Friedrich Schiller in Stuttgart, who studied medicine and completed The Robbers here. Stuttgart, at the end of the 18th century, remained a very provincial town of 20,000 residents, narrow alleys, and agriculture and livestock. Despite being the capital and seat of the Duchy, the general staff of the Army of Württemberg was not present in the city. In 1794, Duke Charles dissolved the Karlsschule to prevent the spreading of revolutionary ideas.

Stuttgart was proclaimed capital once more when Württemberg became an electorate in 1803, and was yet again named as capital when the Kingdom of Württemberg was formed in 1805 by the Peace of Pressburg.

=== Kingdom of Württemberg and German Empire ===
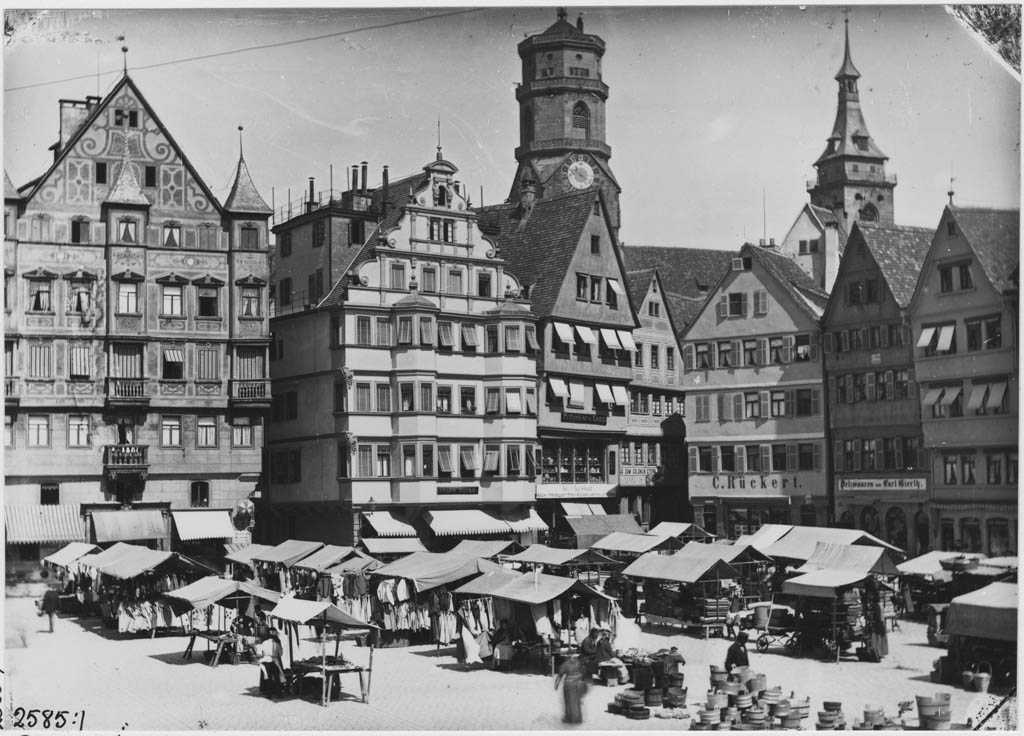
The historic Stuttgart Marktplatz looking west, 1881

King Frederick I's Württemberg was given high status in the Confederation of the Rhine among the College of Kings, and the lands of nearby secondary German states. Within Stuttgart, the royal residence was expanded under Frederick although many of Stuttgart's most important buildings, including Wilhelm Palace, Katharina Hospital, the State Gallery, the Villa Berg and the Königsbau were built under the reign of King Wilhelm I. In 1818. King Wilhelm I and Queen Catherine in an attempt to assuage the suffering caused by the Year Without Summer and following famine, introduced the first Cannstatter Volksfest to celebrate the year's bountiful harvest. Hohenheim University was founded in 1818, and two years later the Württemberg Mausoleum as completed on the hill where Wirtemberg Castle once stood.

From the outset of the 19th century, Stuttgart's development was once again impeded by its location (population of the city at the time was around 50,000), but the city began to experience the beginning of economic revival with the opening of the Main Station in 1846. Prior to then, the signs of rebirth in Stuttgart were evidenced by the construction of such buildings of Rosenstein Castle in 1822–1830, the Wilhelmspalais 1834–1840, and the foundations of the Staatsgalerie in 1843, University of Stuttgart in 1829, the University of Music and Performing Arts later, in 1857. Stuttgart had a role to play during the revolution of 1848/1849 as well. When internal divisions of the Frankfurt Parliament began the demise of that congress, the majority of the Frankfurt Congress voted to move to Stuttgart to flee the reach of the Prussian and Austrian armies in Frankfurt and Mainz. Even though the Congress may have had contacts with revolutionaries in Baden and Württemberg, the Congress, not popular with the content citizens of Stuttgart, were driven out by the King's army.

Stuttgart's literary tradition also bore yet more fruits, being the home of such writers of national importance as Wilhelm Hauff, Ludwig Uhland, Gustav Schwab, and Eduard Mörike. From 1841 to 1846, the Jubiläumssäule was erected on the Schlossplatz before the New Palace according to the plans of Johann Michael Knapp to celebrate the rule of King Wilhelm I. 19 years later, the Königsbau was constructed by Knapp and court architect Christian Friedrich von Leins as concert hall. Another milestone in Stuttgart's history was the running of the first rail line from Cannstatt to Untertürkheim on 22 October 1845. The advent of Industrialisation in Germany heralded a major growth of population for Stuttgart: In 1834, Stuttgart counted 35,200 inhabitants, rose to 50,000 in 1852, 69,084 inhabitants in 1864, and finally 91,000 residents in 1871. By 1874, Stuttgart once again exceeded the 100,000 inhabitant mark. This number doubled, due to the incorporation of local towns, to approximately 185,000 in 1901 and then 200,000 in 1904. In 1871, Württemberg joined the German Empire created by Otto von Bismarck, Prime Minister of Prussia, during the Unification of Germany, as an autonomous kingdom.

Territorial expansion of Stuttgart from 1836 to 1942

Stuttgart is purported to be the location of the car invention by Karl Benz and then industrialized by Gottlieb Daimler and Wilhelm Maybach in a small workshop in Bad Cannstatt that would become Daimler-Motoren-Gesellschaft in 1887. As a result, it is considered to be the starting point of the worldwide automotive industry and is sometimes referred to as the 'cradle of the automobile', and today Mercedes-Benz and Porsche both have their headquarters in Stuttgart, as well as automotive parts giants Bosch and Mahle. The year prior, Robert Bosch opened his first "Workshop for Precision Mechanics and Electrical Engineering" in Stuttgart.

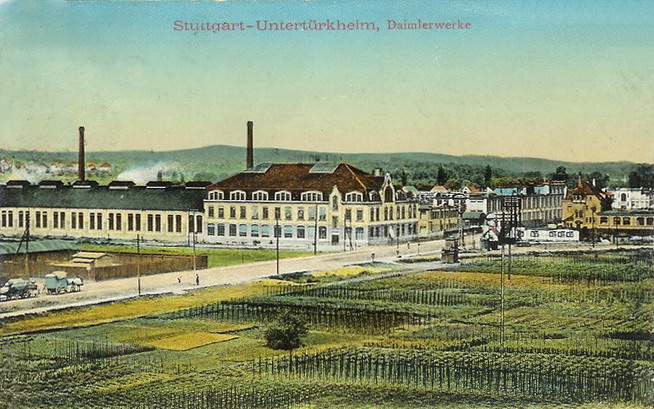
A colorized photo from 1911 of the Daimler-Motoren-Gesellschaft factory in Untertürkheim. Today, this building is the seat of Mercedes-Benz Group.

In 1907, the International Socialist Congress was held in Stuttgart and was attended by about 60,000 people. In 1912, VfB Stuttgart was founded. Two years later, erection of the current iteration of the Stuttgart Hauptbahnhof was started to a plan by Paul Bonatz from 1914 to 1927.

During World War I, the city was a target of air raids. In 1915, 29 bombs struck the city and the nearby Rotebühlkaserne, killing four soldiers and injuring another 43, and likewise killing four civilians. The next major air raid on Stuttgart occurred on 15 September 1918, when structural damage caused houses to collapse, killing eleven people.

=== Weimar Republic ===
At the end of the First World War, November revolutionaries declared a "social republic" in Stuttgart on 9 November and set up a provisional revolutionary government. A week later King Wilhelm II released all civil servants from their oath of allegiance to him and formally abdicated on 30 November. A constituent assembly elected in January 1919 wrote a republican constitution for Württemberg which became effective on 25 September 1919. It established the Free People's State of Württemberg with its capital at Stuttgart as a part of the Weimar Republic. In 1920, Stuttgart temporarily became the seat of the German National Government when the administration fled from Berlin from the Kapp Putsch. Also in 1920, Erwin Rommel became the company commander of the 13th Infantry Regiment based in Stuttgart and would remain as such for the next nine years.

=== Nazi Germany ===
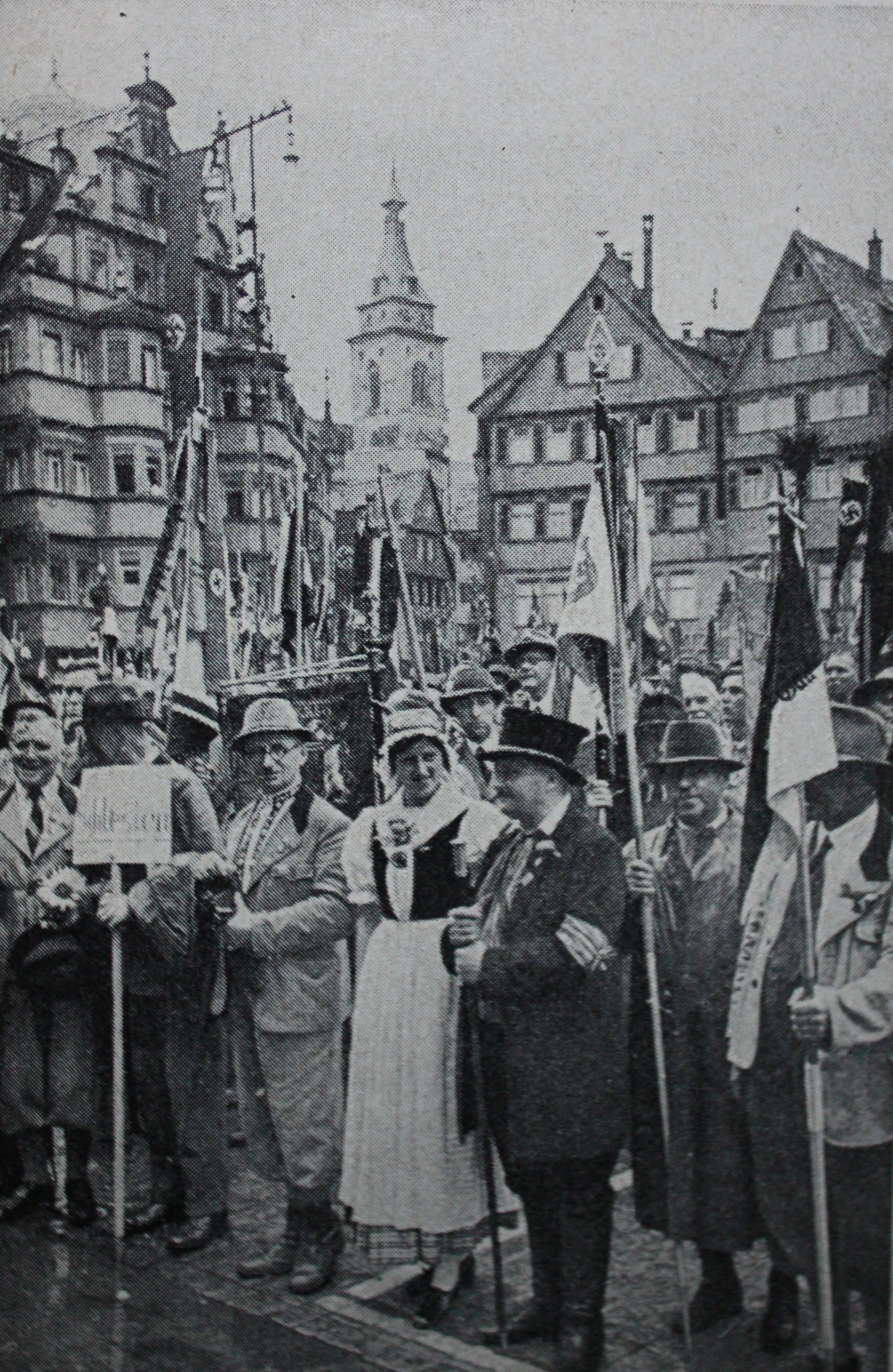
Demonstration at the Stuttgart Marktplatz on German Hiking Day (German: Deutscher Wandertag), 1938

Due to the practice of Gleichschaltung, Stuttgart's political importance as state capital became totally nonexistent, though it remained the cultural and economic centre of the central Neckar region. Stuttgart, one of the cities bestowed an honorary title by the Nazi regime, was given the moniker "City of the Abroad Germans" in 1936. The first prototypes of the Volkswagen Beetle were manufactured in Stuttgart, according to designs by Ferdinand Porsche, by a design team including Erwin Komenda and Karl Rabe.

The Hotel Silber (English: Silver), previously occupied by other forms of political police, was occupied by the Gestapo in 1933 to detain and torture political dissidents. The hotel was used for the transit of prisoners of conscience including Eugen Bolz, Kurt Schumacher, and Lilo Herrmann to concentration camps. The nearby court at Archive Street (German: Archivstraße) 12A was also used as a central location for executions in Southwest Germany, as the headstone located in its atrium dedicated to the 419 lives lost there recalls. Participants of the Kristallnacht burned the Old Synagogue to the ground along with the relics contained within and also destroyed its Jewish cemetery. The next year the Nazi regime began the arrests and deportation of Stuttgart's Jewish inhabitants, beginning with the entire male Jewish population of Stuttgart, to the police-run prison camp at Welzheim or directly to Dachau. Other Jews from around Württemberg were brought to Stuttgart and housed in the ghetto on the former Trade Fair grounds in Killesberg. As the Memorial at Stuttgart North records, between 1941 (the first train arrived 1 December 1941, and took around 1,000 men to Riga) and 1945, more than 2,000 Jews from all over Württemberg were deported to Theresienstadt, Auschwitz, and the ghettos at Riga and Izbica. Of them, only 180 held in Internment survived the Shoah.

Stuttgart, like many of Germany's major cities, was ravaged throughout the war. For the first four years of the war, successful air raids on the city were rare because of the capable defence of the city by Wehrmacht ground forces, the Luftwaffe. Despite opinions among some Royal Air Force members that day-time air raids on the city were suicidal, substantial damage to the city's industrial capacity still occurred, such as the 25 August bombing of the Daimler AG plant in 1940 that killed five people. With the war increasingly turning against the Third Reich, more and more troops were pulled from the defence of the city in 1943 to fight on the Eastern Front. In 1944, the city centre took place that could now more easily attack the city. The heaviest raids took place on 12 September 1944, when the Royal Air Force, dropping over 184,000 bombs – including 75 blockbusters – levelled Stuttgart's city centre, killing 957 people in the resulting firestorm. In totality, Stuttgart was subjected to 53 bombing raids, resulting in the destruction of 57.7% of all buildings in the city, (Note: Of those, 67.8% of the residential buildings and 75% of the Industrial structures were destroyed.) the deaths of 4,477 inhabitants, the disappearance of 85 citizens, and the injury of 8,908 more people. The Allies lost 300 aircraft and seven to ten enlisted men. To commemorate the city citizens who died during the war, the rubble was assembled and used to create the Birkenkopf. As of 2011, over 40% of Stuttgart's buildings dated from before the Second World War.

=== French-American tensions ===
The ground advance into Germany reached Stuttgart in April 1945. Although the attack on the city was to be conducted by the US Seventh Army's 100th Infantry Division, French leader Charles de Gaulle found this to be unacceptable, as he felt the capture of the region by Free French forces would increase French influence in post-war decisions. Independently, he directed General de Lattre to order the French 5th Armored Division, 2nd Moroccan Infantry Division and 3rd Algerian Infantry Division to begin their drive to Stuttgart on 18 April 1945. Two days later, the French forces coordinated with the US Seventh Army and VI Corps heavy artillery, who began a barrage of the city. The French 5th Armored Division then captured Stuttgart on 21 April 1945, encountering little resistance. The city fared poorly under their direction; French troops forcefully quartered their troops in what housing remained in the city, rapes were frequent (there were at least 1,389 recorded incidents of rape of civilians by French soldiers), and the city's surviving populace were poorly rationed. (Note: "When French troops occupied Stuttgart – which was meant to form part of the American Zone as the capital of Württemberg – the Americans ordered them to leave. De Gaulle refused, saying he would stay put until the zones were finalized ... The American solution was to offer them some bits of Baden and Württemberg while keeping the lion's share for themselves ... French soldiers' behaviour in Stuttgart, where some 3,000 women and 8 men were raped, was thought to have added to American fury at their overstepping their lines.") The circumstances of what later became known as "The Stuttgart Crisis" provoked political repercussions that reached even the White House. President Harry S. Truman was unable to get De Gaulle to withdraw troops from Stuttgart until after the final boundaries of the zones of occupation were established. The French army remained in the city until they finally relented to American demands on 8 July 1945 and withdrew. Stuttgart then became capital of Württemberg-Baden, one of the three areas of Allied occupation in Baden-Württemberg, from 1945 until 1952.

=== Baden-Württemberg ===
The military government of the American occupation zone established a Displaced persons camp for displaced persons, mostly forced labourers from Central and Eastern European industrial firms in the area. There was, however, a camp located in Stuttgart-West that, until its closure and transportation of internees to Heidenheim an der Brenz in 1949, housed almost exclusively 1400 Jewish survivors of the Shoah.

An early concept of the Marshall Plan aimed at supporting reconstruction and economic/political recovery across Europe was presented during a speech 6 September 1946 given by US Secretary of State James F. Byrnes at the Stuttgart Opera House. His speech led to the unification of the British and American occupation zones, resulting in the 'bi-zone' (later the 'tri-zone' when the French reluctantly agreed to cede their occupied territory to the new state). In 1948, the city applied to become the capital of the soon to-be Federal Republic of Germany, and was a serious contender against Frankfurt, Kassel, and Bonn. All these cities were examined by the Parlamentarischer Rat, but ultimately Bonn won the bid when the Republic was founded on 23 May 1949. The city's bid for capital failed primarily because of the financial burdens its high rents would place on the government.

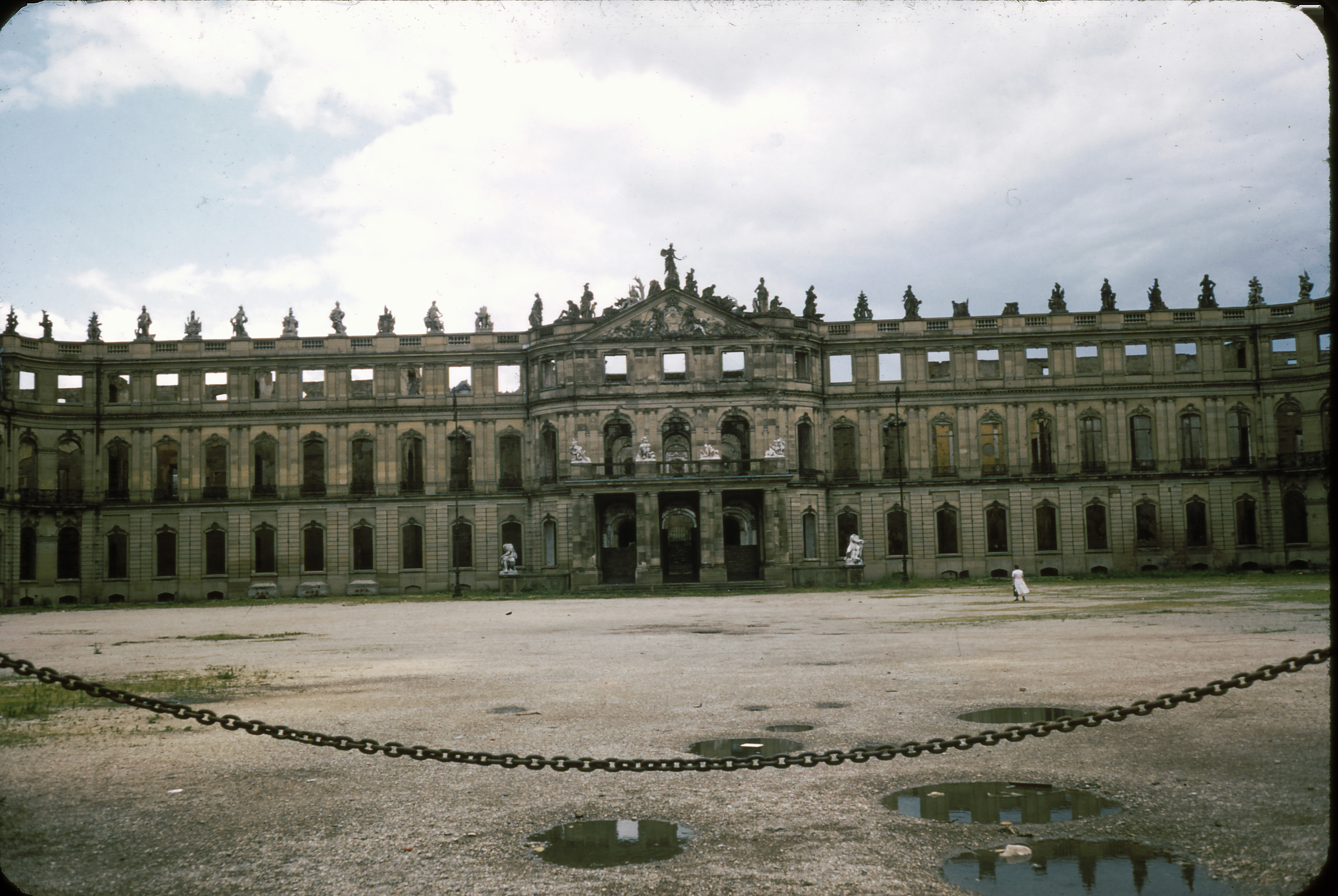
War-damaged Neues Schloss at Schlossplatz prior to restoration, 1956

The immediate aftermath of the War would be marked by the controversial efforts of Arnulf Klett, the first Oberbürgermeister of Stuttgart, to restore the city. Klett favored the idea of a modernist Automotive city with functional divisions for residential, commercial and industrial areas according to the Athens Charter. Klett demolished both ruins and entire streets of largely undamaged buildings without rebuilding them to their original visage, a move that earned him much scorn from his contemporaries. In the 150th year since his death (1955), the last remnant of the alma mater of Friedrich Schiller, the Karlsschule, was removed in favor of an expansion to the Bundesstraße 14. Klett also dramatically expanded the public transportation of Stuttgart with the Stuttgart Stadtbahn and, in 1961, initiated a city partnership with the French city of Strasbourg as part of an attempt to mend Franco-German relations. It would be finalized in 1962 and is still active today. Klett's Stuttgart saw two major media events: the same year the partnership with Strasbourg was finalized, then French president Charles de Gaulle visited the city and Ludwigsburg Palace in the ending moments of his state visit to Germany, and Queen Elizabeth II of the United Kingdom visited the city 24 May 1965.

On 25 April 1952, the other two parts of the former German states of Baden and Württemberg, South Baden and Württemberg-Hohenzollern merged and formed the modern German state of Baden-Württemberg, with Stuttgart as its capital. Since the 1950s, Stuttgart has been the third largest city in southern Germany behind Frankfurt and Munich. The city's population, halved by the Second World War, began sudden growth with the mass influx of German refugees expelled from their homes and communities by the Soviets from the late 1940s until 1950 to the city. Economic migrants, called "Gastarbeiter", from Italy, and later Greece and Turkey but primarily from Yugoslavia, came flocking to Stuttgart because of the economic wonder called the "Wirtschaftswunder" unfolding in West Germany. These factors saw the city reach its (then) peak population of 640,000 in 1962.

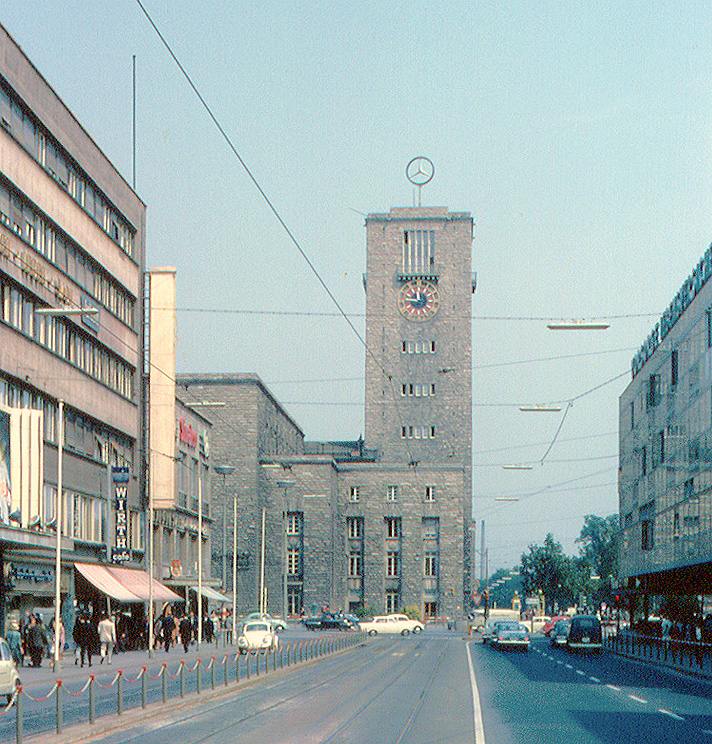
Stuttgart's Hauptbahnhof from the Königstraße, 1965

In May 1965 Queen Elizabeth II made a state visit to Stuttgart and nearby Marbach and Schwäbisch Hall. Her great-grandfather Duke Francis (1837–1900) had been a member of the Württemberg royal family.

In the late 1970s, the municipal district of Stammheim was centre stage to one of the most controversial periods of German post-war history. Stammheim Prison, built from 1959 to 1963, came to be the place of incarceration for Ulrike Meinhof, Andreas Baader, Gudrun Ensslin, and Jan-Carl Raspe, members of a communist terrorist organization known as the Red Army Faction, during their trial at the Oberlandesgericht Stuttgart in 1975. Several attempts were made by the organization to free the terrorists during the "German Autumn" of 1977 that culminated in such events as the kidnap and murder of Hanns-Martin Schleyer and the hijacking of Lufthansa Flight 181. When it became clear, after many attempts to free the inmates including the smuggling of three weapons into the prison by their lawyer, that the terrorists could not escape and that they would receive life sentencing, the terrorists killed themselves (Note: Meinhof had by this point already committed suicide via hanging in her cell, 9 May 1976.) in April 1977 in an event remembered locally as the "Todesnacht von Stammheim", "Night of Death at Stammheim".

The trauma of the early 1970s was quickly left behind, starting in 1974 with the 1974 FIFA World Cup and the opening of the Stuttgart S-Bahn on 1 October 1978 with a scheduled three routes. from 17 to 19 June 1983, ten European heads of state and representatives from the European Union met in Stuttgart for a summit and there made the Solemn Declaration on European Union. In 1986, the European Athletics Championships of that year were held in the Neckarstadion. Mikhail Gorbachev, while on a trip to West Germany to offer a spot for a West German astronaut in a Soviet space mission, visited Stuttgart 14 June 1989 and was the honored guest of a sumptuous reception held at the New Palace.

Since the monumental happenings of the 1980s, Stuttgart has continued being an important centre of not just Europe, but also the world. In 1993, the World Horticultural Exposition, for which two new bridges were built, and World Athletics Championships of that year took place in Stuttgart in the Killesburg park and Gottlieb-Daimler-Stadion respectively, bringing millions of new visitors to the city. At the 1993 WCA, British athlete Sally Gunnell and the United States Relay team both set world records. In 2003, Stuttgart applied for the 2012 Summer Olympics but failed when the German Committee for the Olympics decided on Leipzig to host the Olympics in Germany. Three years later, in 2006, Stuttgart once again hosted the FIFA World Cup as it had in 1974.

Stuttgart still experienced some growing pains even long after its recovery from the Second World War. In 2010, the inner city become the focal point of the protests against the controversial Stuttgart 21.

==== US military in Stuttgart ====
Since shortly after the end of World War II, there has been a US military presence in Stuttgart. At the height of the Cold War over 45,000 Americans were stationed across over 40 installations in and around the city. Today about 10,000 Americans are stationed on 5 installations (Patch Barracks, Panzer Kaserne, Kelley Barracks, Robinson Barracks, and Stuttgart Army Airfield) representing all branches of service within the Department of Defense, unlike the mostly Army presence of the Occupation and Cold War.

In March 1946 the United States Army established a unit of the US Constabulary and a headquarter at Kurmärker Kaserne (later renamed Patch Barracks) in Stuttgart. These units of soldiers retrained and policing provided the law and order in the American zone of occupied Germany until the civilian German police forces could be re-established. In 1948 the headquarters for all Constabulary forces was moved to Stuttgart. In 2008 a memorial to the US Constabulary was installed and dedicated at Patch Barracks. The US Constabulary headquarters was disbanded in 1950 and most of the force was merged into the newly organized 7th Army. As the Cold War developed US Army VII Corps was re-formed in July 1950 and assigned to Hellenen Kaserne (renamed Kelley Barracks in 1951) where the headquarters was to remain throughout the Cold War.

In 1990 VII Corps was deployed directly from Germany to Saudi Arabia for Operations Desert Shield and Desert Storm to include many of the VII Corps stationed in and around Stuttgart. After returning from the Middle East, VII Corps units were reassigned to the United States or deactivated. The VII Corps Headquarters returned to Germany for a short period to close out operations and was deactivated later in the United States. The withdrawal of VII Corps caused a large reduction in the US military presence in the city and region and led to the closure of the majority of US installations in and around Stuttgart which resulted in the layoff of many local civilians who had been career employees of the US Army.

Since 1967, Patch Barracks in Stuttgart has been home to the US EUCOM. In 2007 AFRICOM was established as a cell within EUCOM and in 2008 established as the US Unified Combatant Command responsible for most of Africa headquartered at Kelley Barracks. Due to these two major headquarters, Stuttgart has been identified as one of the few "enduring communities" where the United States forces will continue to operate in Germany. The remaining U.S. bases around Stuttgart are organized into US Army Garrison Stuttgart and include Patch Barracks, Robinson Barracks, Panzer Kaserne and Kelley Barracks. From the end of World War II until the early 1990s these installations excepting Patch were almost exclusively Army, but have become increasingly "Purple"—as in joint service—since the end of the Cold War as they are host to United States Department of Defense Unified Commands and supporting activities.

== Geography ==
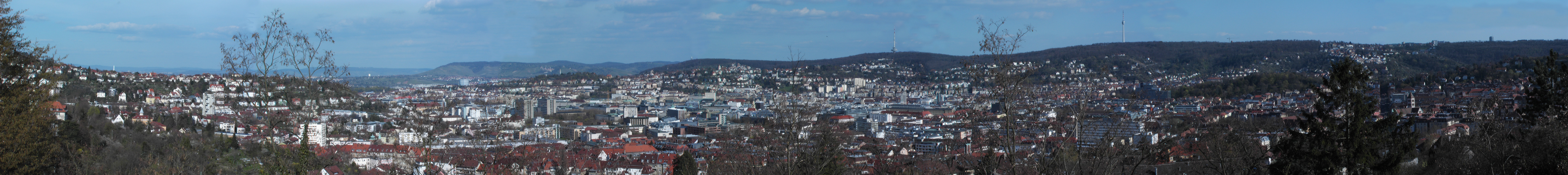
Panorama of Stuttgart looking southeast. From the Neckar valley on the left the city rises to the city centre, backed to the south (television tower). Stuttgart South and Stuttgart West are to the right.

The core area of Stuttgart lies in the 48° fertile bowl angle about 900 ft (270 m) above sea level, (Note: The nature of Stuttgart's hilly landscape often makes changes in the city's height. By the Neckar, the elevation is about 207 m (679 ft), whereas the highest elevation Bernhartshöhe is 549 m (1,801 ft) – something rather unique in large German cities.) an hour from the Black Forest and Swabian Jura on the banks of the Neckar river at 48°47′N 9°11′E 115 mi (185 km) to the west and north of Munich. The city is often described as being "zwischen Wald und Reben" ("between forest and vines") because of its viticulture and surrounding forests. Stuttgart covers an area of 207.35 km^{2} (80 sq mi) and sits at elevation ranging from 207 m (679 ft) above sea level by the Neckar river to 549 m (1,801 ft) on Bernhartshöhe hill – something rather unique in large German cities. The most prominent elevated locales in Stuttgart are the Birkenkopf (511 m (1,677 ft)) on the edge of the 51° bowl angle to the Württemberg (411 m (1,348 ft)) rising above the 34° Neckar angle, and the Grüner Heiner (395 m (1,296 ft)) at the northeast end of the city.

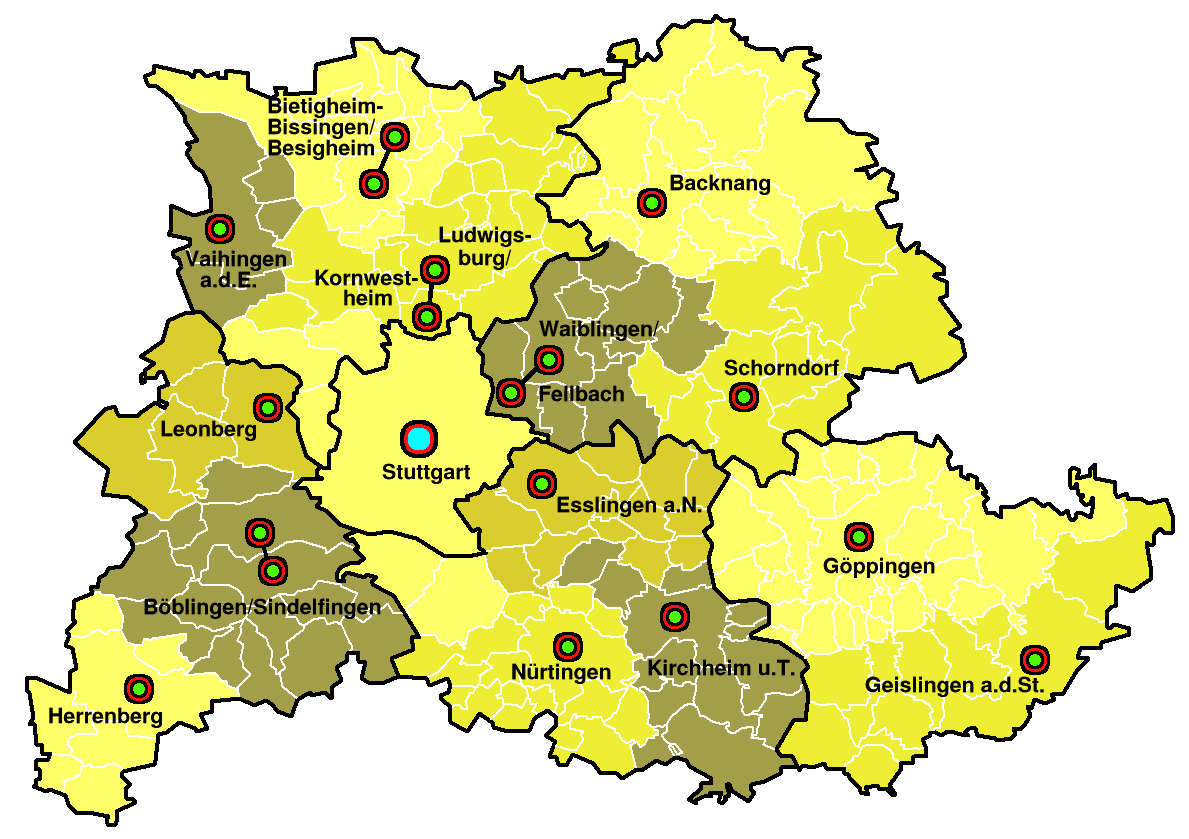
Stuttgart Region with centers

Stuttgart is one of 14 regional centers in Baden-Württemberg and is naturally the primary centre of the Stuttgart Region, making it the administrative centre for a region of 3,700 km^{2} (1,400 mi^{2}) containing a total of 2.76 million people as of December 2014. In addition, Stuttgart serves as a Mittelzentrum for Esslingen District cities Leinfelden-Echterdingen and Filderstadt as well as Ditzingen, Gerlingen, and Korntal-Münchingen in Ludwigsburg District. Stuttgart is also chief of the three centres Stuttgart Metropolitan Region, an area of 15,000 km^{2} (5,800 mi^{2}) containing 5.5 million persons.

Mittelzentrum / Middle-Stage centers of the Stuttgart Region
Backnang, Bietigheim-Bissingen / Besigheim, Böblingen / Sindelfingen, Esslingen am Neckar, Geislingen, Göppingen, Herrenberg, Kirchheim unter Teck, Leonberg, Ludwigsburg / Kornwestheim, Nürtingen, Schorndorf, Vaihingen an der Enz, Waiblingen / Fellbach

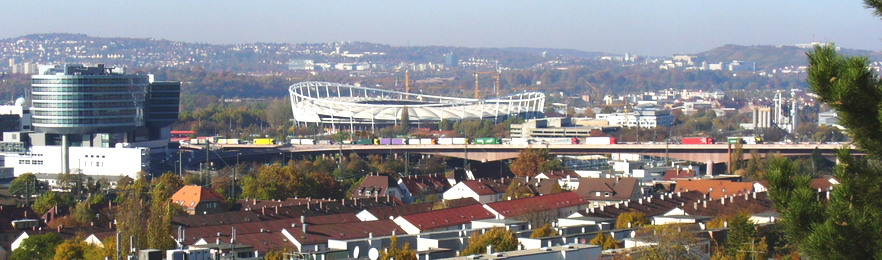
Untertürkheim

=== Climate ===
Stuttgart experiences an oceanic climate (Köppen: Cfb). Its summers are warm, with average highs around 25 °C (77 °F), while its winters are chilly, with daily means just above freezing. Annually, the city receives average 718.7 mm (28.30 in) of rain. On average, Stuttgart enjoys 1,807 hours of sunshine per year and an average annual temperature of 9 °C (48 °F).

Typically during summer months, the nearby hills, Swabian Alb mountains, the Black Forest, Schurwald, and the Swabian-Franconian Forest act as shields from harsh weather, nevertheless the city can be subject to thunderstorms, whereas in the winter periods snow may last for several days. Snow cover tends to last no longer than a few days although it had lasted several weeks at a time as recently as 2010. Though it is a rare occurrence in Stuttgart, the city sometimes receives damaging hailstorms, such as in July 2013. In order to fight this phenomenon, weather stations known as "Hagelflieger" are stationed near the city and are largely funded by Daimler AG, who maintain several parking lots and factories in the municipal area.

Climate data for Stuttgart (Schnarrenberg) (1991–2020 normals, extremes 1958–2014)
Month	Jan	Feb	Mar	Apr	May	Jun	Jul	Aug	Sep	Oct	Nov	Dec	Year
Record high °C (°F)	17.1 (62.8)	21.0 (69.8)	25.3 (77.5)	27.7 (81.9)	31.5 (88.7)	38.7 (101.7)	37.0 (98.6)	37.7 (99.9)	32.2 (90.0)	29.7 (85.5)	20.3 (68.5)	16.5 (61.7)	38.7 (101.7)
Mean daily maximum °C (°F)	4.9 (40.8)	6.5 (43.7)	10.9 (51.6)	15.8 (60.4)	19.7 (67.5)	23.0 (73.4)	25.2 (77.4)	25.1 (77.2)	20.3 (68.5)	15.1 (59.2)	9.1 (48.4)	5.5 (41.9)	15.1 (59.2)
Daily mean °C (°F)	2.1 (35.8)	3.0 (37.4)	6.6 (43.9)	10.7 (51.3)	14.6 (58.3)	18.1 (64.6)	20.0 (68.0)	19.7 (67.5)	15.3 (59.5)	10.7 (51.3)	5.9 (42.6)	2.8 (37.0)	10.8 (51.4)
Mean daily minimum °C (°F)	−0.6 (30.9)	−0.3 (31.5)	2.5 (36.5)	5.7 (42.3)	9.7 (49.5)	13.1 (55.6)	15.0 (59.0)	14.7 (58.5)	10.8 (51.4)	7.1 (44.8)	3.0 (37.4)	0.3 (32.5)	6.7 (44.1)
Record low °C (°F)	−25.5 (−13.9)	−20.3 (−4.5)	−18.6 (−1.5)	−6.3 (20.7)	−1.9 (28.6)	3.3 (37.9)	5.5 (41.9)	3.8 (38.8)	0.2 (32.4)	−6.3 (20.7)	−15.3 (4.5)	−18.5 (−1.3)	−25.5 (−13.9)
Average precipitation mm (inches)	39.9 (1.57)	32.7 (1.29)	36.5 (1.44)	35.4 (1.39)	76.3 (3.00)	75.6 (2.98)	81.3 (3.20)	72.1 (2.84)	47.4 (1.87)	51.8 (2.04)	49.9 (1.96)	49.9 (1.96)	649.7 (25.58)
Average precipitation days (≥ 0.1 m)	15.8	13.7	13.5	12.6	15.0	14.7	14.3	13.7	11.9	13.6	15.2	17.1	169.1
Average relative humidity (%)	80.1	75.3	69.3	64.1	66.6	66.7	65.2	66.9	73.4	79.8	82.6	82.3	72.7
Mean monthly sunshine hours	69.3	91.2	142.5	186.7	209.5	218.6	241.6	225.6	169.4	116.4	72.0	60.1	1,813.8
Source 1: NOAA/World Meteorological Organization; Data derived from Deutscher Wetterdienst
Source 2: KNMI

=== Climate atlas and ventilation corridors ===
Stuttgart has become a widely cited case study in urban climatology for its use of ventilation corridors to mitigate the effects of heat and air pollution. Owing to its location in a basin surrounded by hills, the city is prone to stagnant air masses and elevated summer temperatures. To address these challenges, municipal planners developed a detailed Climate Atlas (Klimaanalyse) beginning in the late 20th century, which maps local wind patterns, cold-air drainage flows, and areas of heat accumulation.

The atlas has informed zoning regulations that preserve open spaces and prohibit construction in designated corridors, allowing cooler night-time air from surrounding forests and vineyards to flow into the urban core. These corridors also function as green belts, providing ecological and recreational benefits in addition to climate regulation. Studies in urban climatology have highlighted Stuttgart's approach as an early example of integrating microclimatic analysis into statutory planning, influencing similar initiatives in other European and Asian cities.

== Landmarks and culture ==
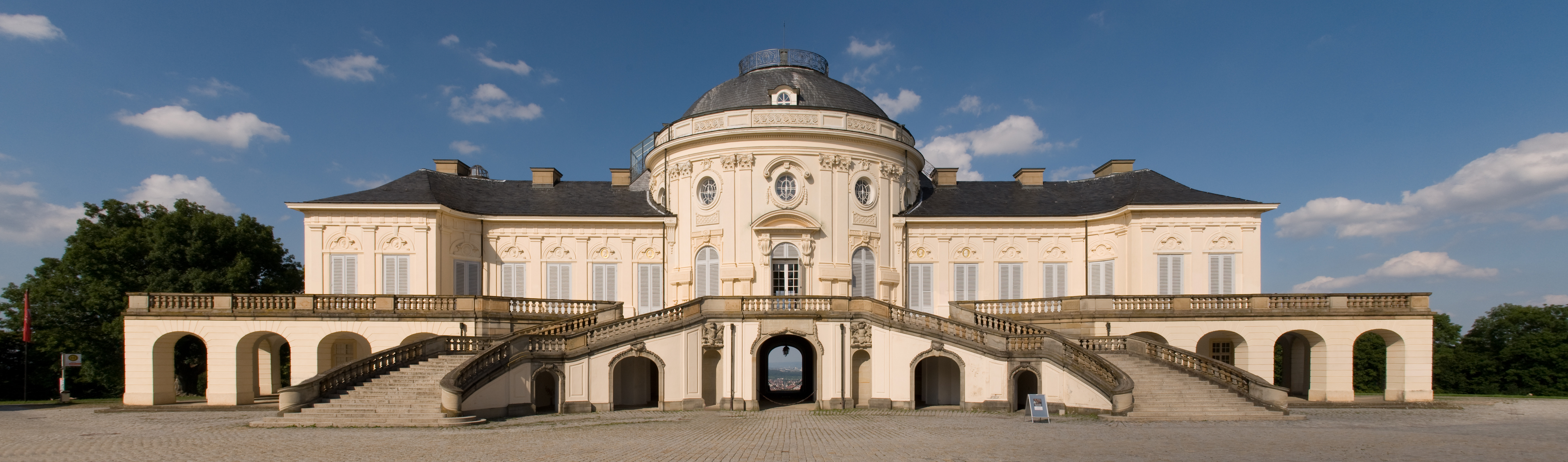
Solitude Palace

=== Inner city ===
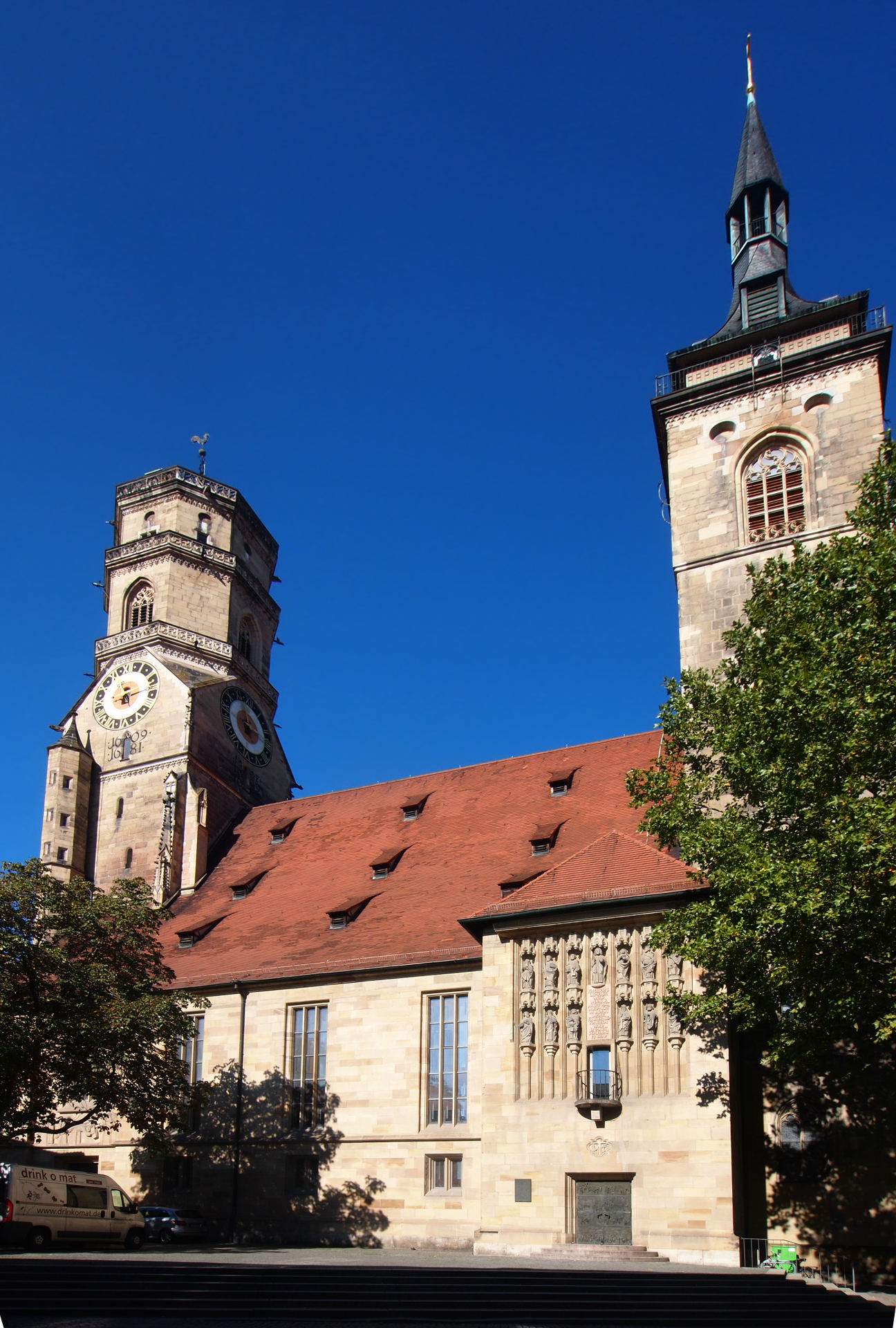
The Stiftskirche, seen from south-east (Kirchstraße)

At the center of Stuttgart lies its main square, Schlossplatz. As well as being the largest square in Stuttgart, it stands at the crossover point between the city's shopping area, Schlossgarten park which runs down to the river Neckar, Stuttgart's two central castles and major museums and residential areas to the south west. Königstraße, Stuttgart's most important shopping street which runs along the northwestern edge of Schlossplatz, claims to be the longest pedestrianized street in Germany.

Although the city center was heavily damaged during World War II, many historic buildings have been reconstructed and the city boasts some fine pieces of modern post-war architecture. Buildings and squares of note in the inner city include:

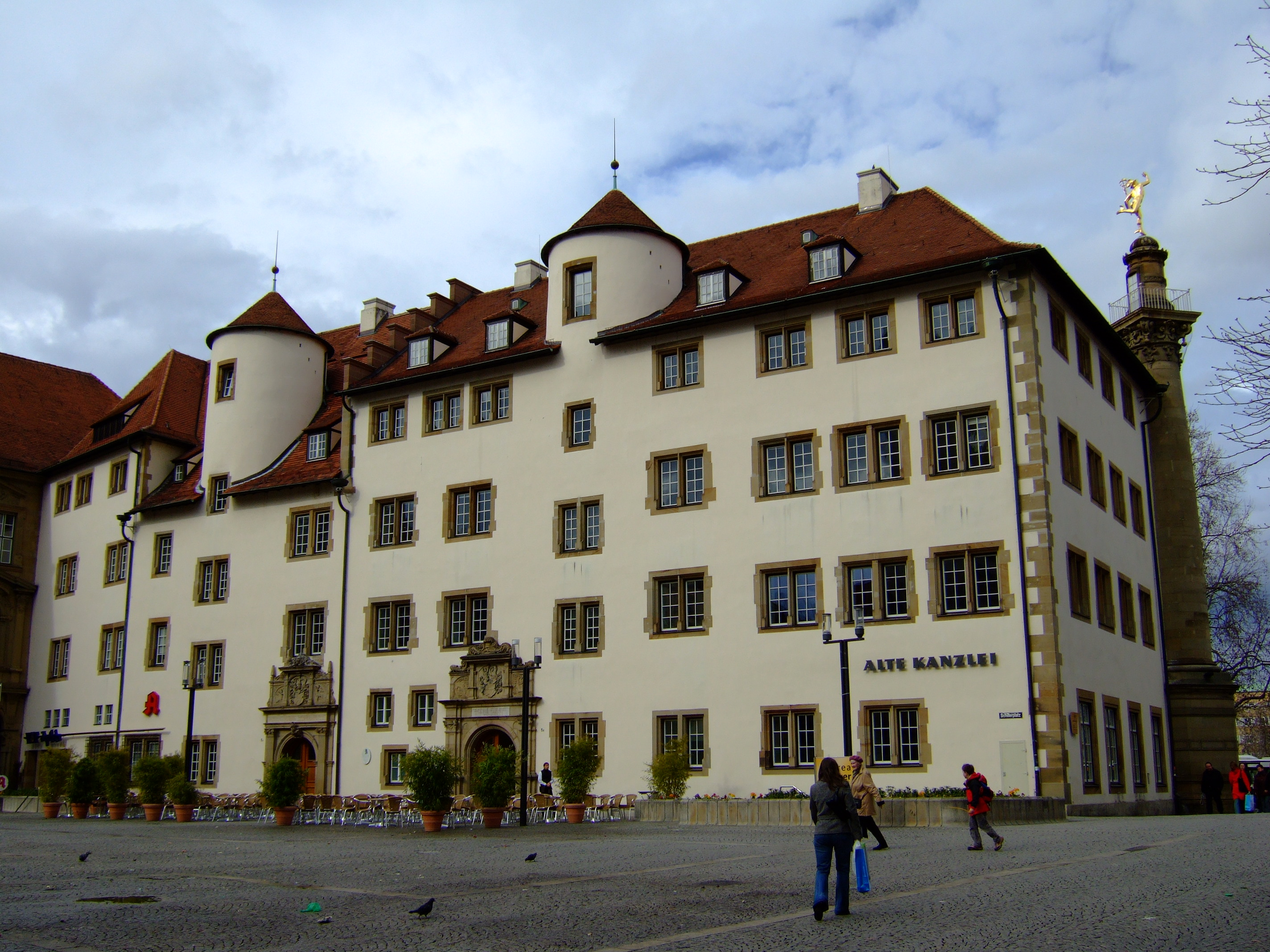
The Alte Kanzlei on Schillerplatz square

- The Stiftskirche (Collegiate Church), dates back to the 12th century, but was changed to the Late Gothic style in the 15th century and has been a Protestant church since 1534. Exterior: Romanesque/Gothic; interior: Romanesque/Gothic/Modern. Reconstructed with simplified interior after World War II.
- Altes Schloss (the Old Castle), mostly dating from the late 15th century, some parts (BUNTs) date back to 1320. Renaissance style; reconstructed.
- Alte Kanzlei (the Old Chancellery) on Schillerplatz which backs onto the 1598 Mercury Pillar
- Neues Schloss (the New Castle), completed in 1807. Baroque/Classicism); reconstructed with modern interior, currently houses government offices (ZὍFFs). The cellars with a collection of stone fragments from the Roman times are open to visitors.
- Wilhelmpalais (the Wilhelm Palace) on Charlottenplatz, completed in 1840 and rebuilt in 1965.
- Königsbau (the King's Building), 1850. Classicism; reconstructed; has been housing the "Königsbau Passagen" shopping centre since 2006.
- The Großes Haus of Stuttgart National Theatre, 1909–1912
- Markthalle Market Hall, 1910 (Art Nouveau)
- The Hauptbahnhof (Main Railway Station) was designed in 1920; its stark, functional lines are typical of the artistic trend 'Neue Sachlichkeit' (New Objectivity).
- The Württembergische Landesbibliothek state library, rebuilt in 1970
- Friedrichsbau Varieté (Friedrich Building), rebuilt in 1994 on the site of the former art nouveau building

=== Architecture in other districts ===
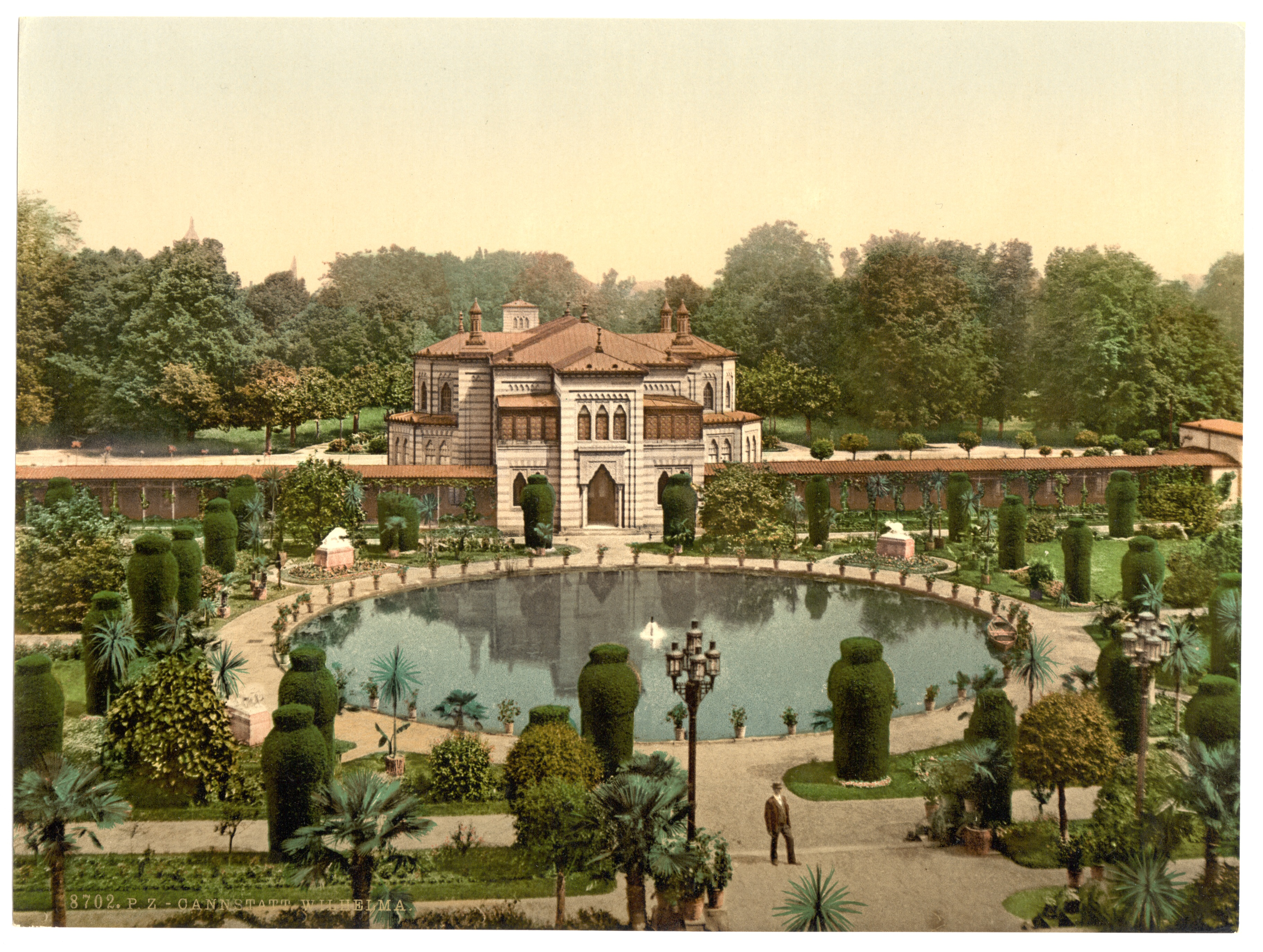
Wilhelma Zoo and Botanical Garden, c. 1900

A number of significant castles stand in Stuttgart's suburbs and beyond as reminders of the city's royal past. These include:

- Castle Solitude, 1700–1800. In Baroque/Rococo style.
- Ludwigsburg Palace, 1704–1758. Baroque, with its enormous Baroque garden.
- Castle Hohenheim, 1771–1793

Other landmarks in and around Stuttgart include (see also museums below):

- Castle Rosenstein (1822–1830), classical
- Württemberg Mausoleum (1824) which holds the remains of Catherine Pavlovna of Russia and King William I of Württemberg
- Wilhelma Zoo and Botanical Gardens (1853)
- The Observation Tower of Burgholzhof, an 1891 brick observation tower constructed by the Cannstatt municipal architect Friedrich Keppler on behalf of the Verschönerungsverein Cannstatt e. V. ("Society for the Beautification of Cannstatt"), in the style of a Roman tower
- Weissenhof Estate (1927), International Style
- Friedenskirche, a 1893–1992 built church using the 1892 tower with double clock (first clock: above I-XII, below 1–4, second clock: above Full moon-First quarter (moondial), below I-XXIII (AM/PM clock))
- The TV Tower (1950), the world's first concrete TV tower
- Stuttgart Airport Terminal Building, 2000. In neighboring Leinfelden-Echterdingen.
- Vodafone-Funkturm Stuttgart-Vaihingen (1998), a radio tower

=== Parks, lakes, cemeteries and other places of interest ===
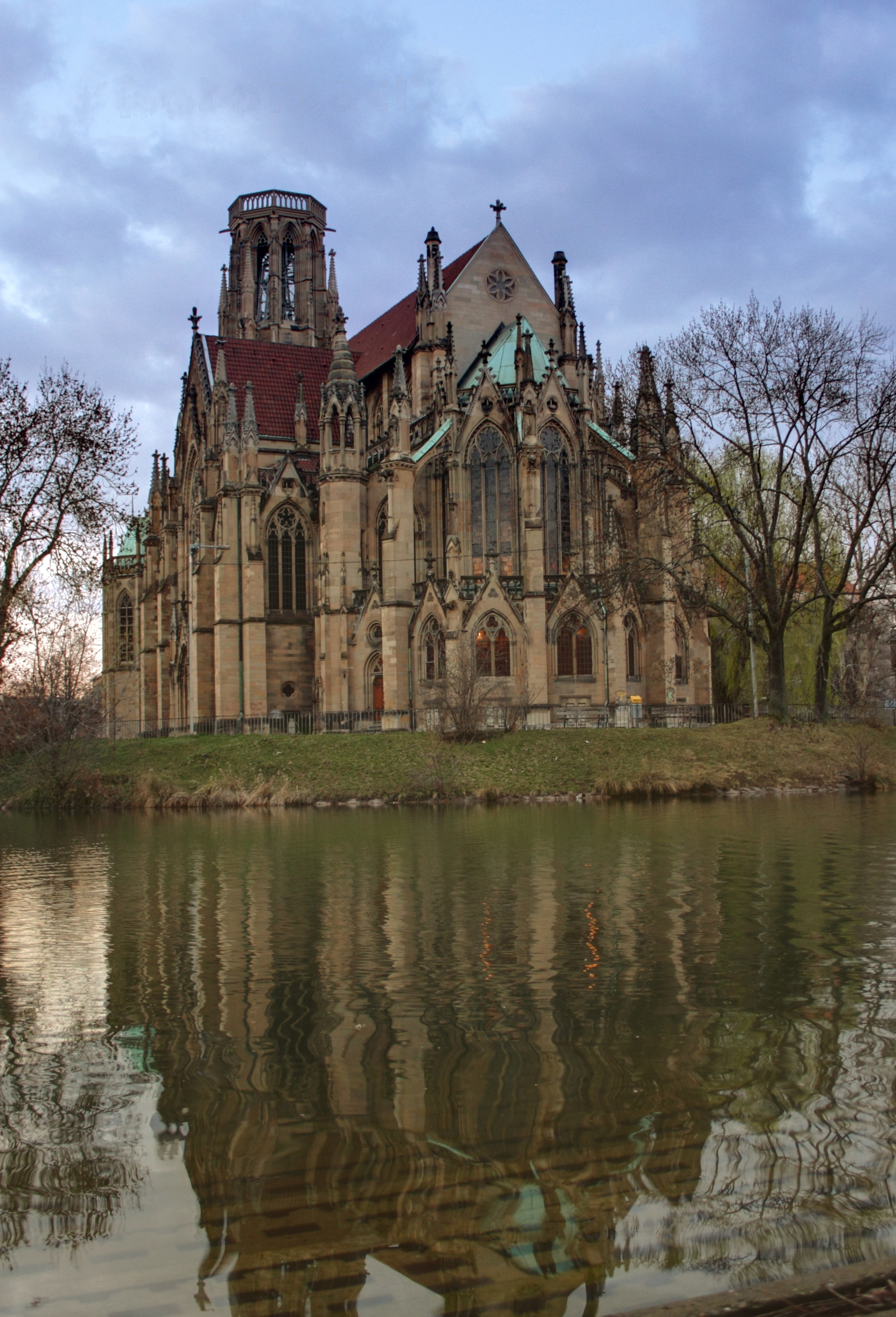
The Johanneskirche on the Feuersee, designed by Christian Friedrich von Leins

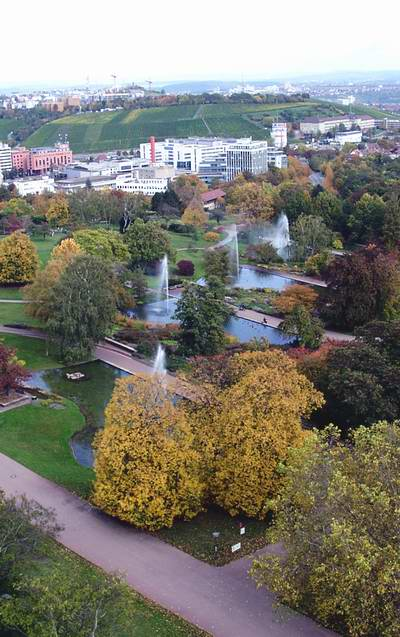
Killesbergpark with fountains and vineyards in the background

At the center of Stuttgart lies a series of gardens which are popular with families and cyclists. Because of its shape on a map, the locals refer to it as the Green U starts with the old Schlossgarten, castle gardens first mentioned in records in 1350. The modern park stretches down to the river Neckar and is divided into the upper garden (bordering the Old Castle, the Main Station, the State Theater and the State Parliament building), and the middle and lower gardens – a total of 61 hectares. The park also houses Stuttgart planetarium.

At the far end of Schlossgarten lies the second Green U park, the larger Rosensteinpark which borders Stuttgart's Wilhelma zoo and botanical gardens. Planted by King William I of Württemberg, it contains many old trees and open areas and counts as the largest English-style garden in southern Germany. In the grounds of the park stands the former Rosenstein castle, now the Rosenstein Museum.

Beyond bridges over adjacent main road B61 lies the final Green U park, Killesbergpark or 'Höhenpark' which is a former ʼJugendheimʼ that was converted for the Third Reich garden show of 1939 (and was used as a collection point for Jews awaiting transportation to concentration camps). The park has been used to stage many gardening shows since the 1950s, including the Bundesgartenschau and 1993 International Gardening Show, and runs miniature trains all around the park in the summer months for children and adults. The viewing tower (Killesbergturm) offers unique views across to the northeast of Stuttgart.

On the northern edge of the Rosensteinpark is the famous 'Wilhelma', Germany's only combined zoological and botanical garden. The whole compound, with its ornate pavilions, greenhouses, walls and gardens was built around 1850 as a summer palace in moorish style for King Wilhelm I of Württemberg. It currently houses around 8000 animals and some 5000 plant species and contains the biggest magnolia grove in Europe.

Other parks in Stuttgart include the historic Botanischer Garten der Universität Hohenheim and Landesarboretum Baden-Württemberg at Castle Hohenheim (which date back to 1776 and are still used to catalog and research plant species), Uhlandshöhe hill (between the city center, Bad Cannstatt and Frauenkopf, and home to Stuttgart observatory), the Weißenburgpark (a five-hectare park in the Bopser area of Stuttgart South which dates back to 1834 and is now home to a 'tea house' and the 'marble room' and offers a relaxing view across the city center), the Birkenkopf a Schuttberg (at 511 m or 1,677 ft the highest point in central Stuttgart, where many ruins were laid to commemorate the Second World War), and the Eichenhain park in Sillenbuch (declared a nature reserve in 1958 and home to 200 oak trees, many 300–400 years old).

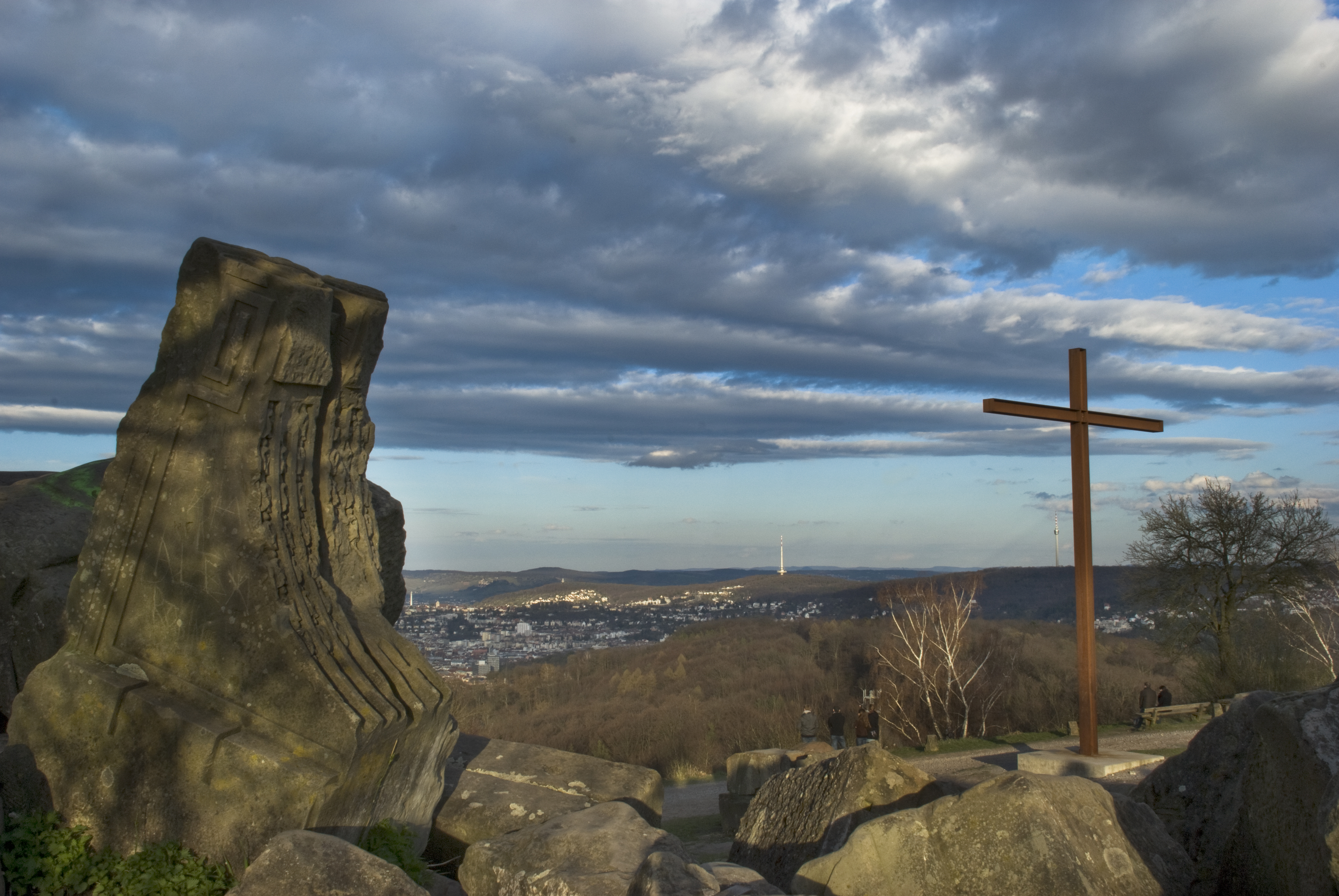
View from the Birkenkopf

There are a number of natural and artificial lakes and ponds in Stuttgart. The largest is the Max-Eyth-See, which was created in 1935 by reclaiming and is now an official nature reserve. It is surrounded by an expansive open area overlooked by vineyards on the banks of the river Neckar near Mühlhausen. There are expansive areas of woodland to the west and south west of Stuttgart which are popular with walkers, families, cyclists and ramblers. The most frequented lakes form a 3 km (1.9 mi) trio made up of the Bärensee, Neuer See and Pfaffensee. The lakes are also used for local water supplies.

In the Feuersee area in the west of Stuttgart lies one of two 'Feuersee's (literally fire lakes), striking for its views of the Johanneskirche (St. Johns) church across the lake, surrounded by nearby houses and offices. The other Feuersee can be found in Vaihingen. Another nature area in Vaihigen is Büsnauer Wiesental Nature Reserve.

Cemeteries in Stuttgart include:

- The Hoppenlaufriedhof in Central Stuttgart, the oldest remaining cemetery which dates back to 1626, an infirmary graveyard last used in 1951
- The Waldfriedhof, the 1913 forest cemetery that is connected to Südheimer Platz by funicular railway
- The Pragfriedhof, with its Art Nouveau crematorium. Established in 1873 it was extended to include Jewish graves in 1874 and also now houses the Russian Orthodox Church of Alexander Nevsky.
- The Uff-Kirchhof cemetery in Bad Cannstatt which stands at the crossroads of two ancient Roman roads and Cannstatter Hauptfriedhof, the largest graveyard in Stuttgart which has been used as a Muslim burial ground since 1985

The city boasts the second largest mineral water deposits in Europe after Budapest, with over 250 springs within the urban area. The Athenebrunnen (or Fountain of Pallas Athena) is along Jean-Amery-Weg in the western part of Stuttgart, dating from 1911.

=== Culture and events ===
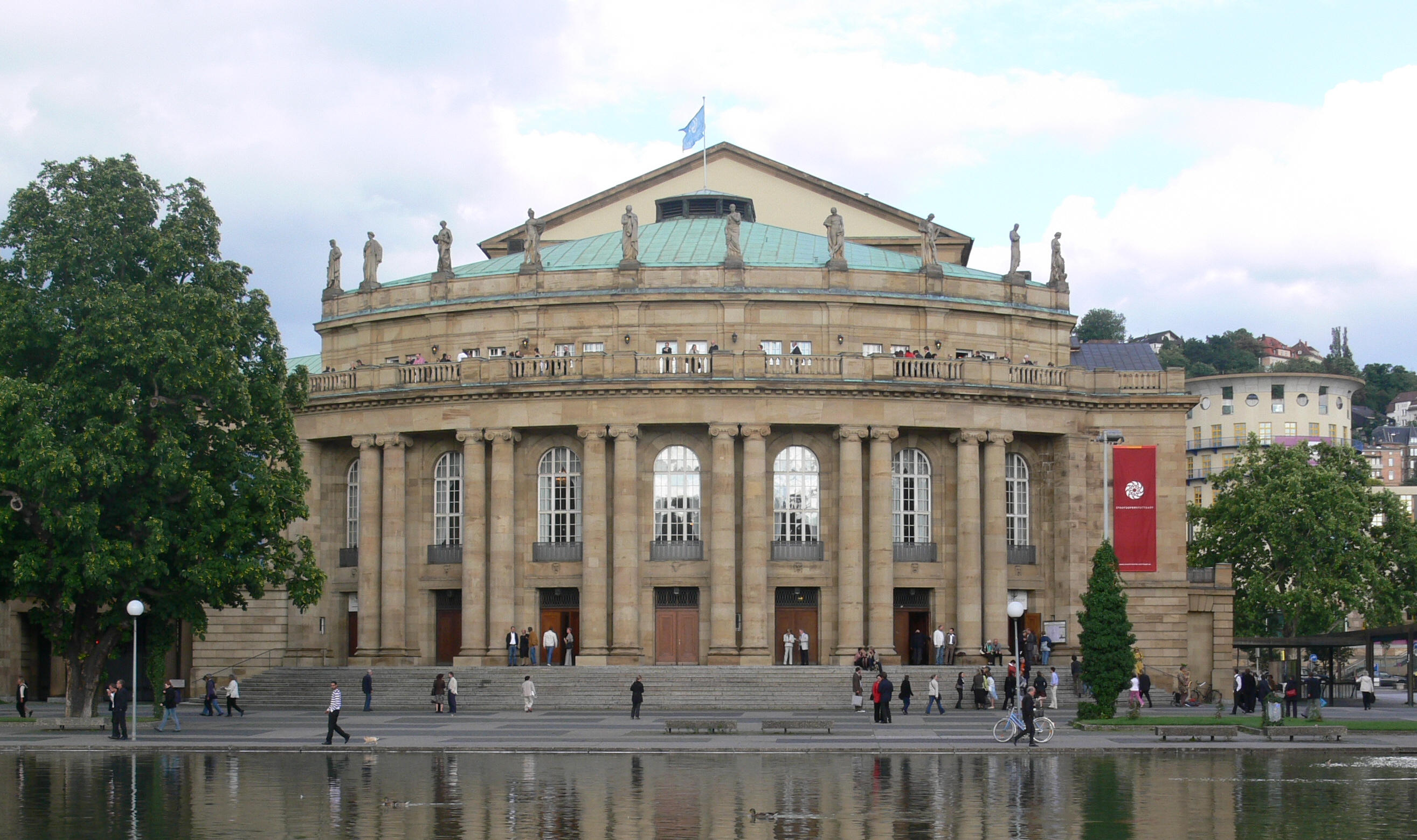
The State Opera House

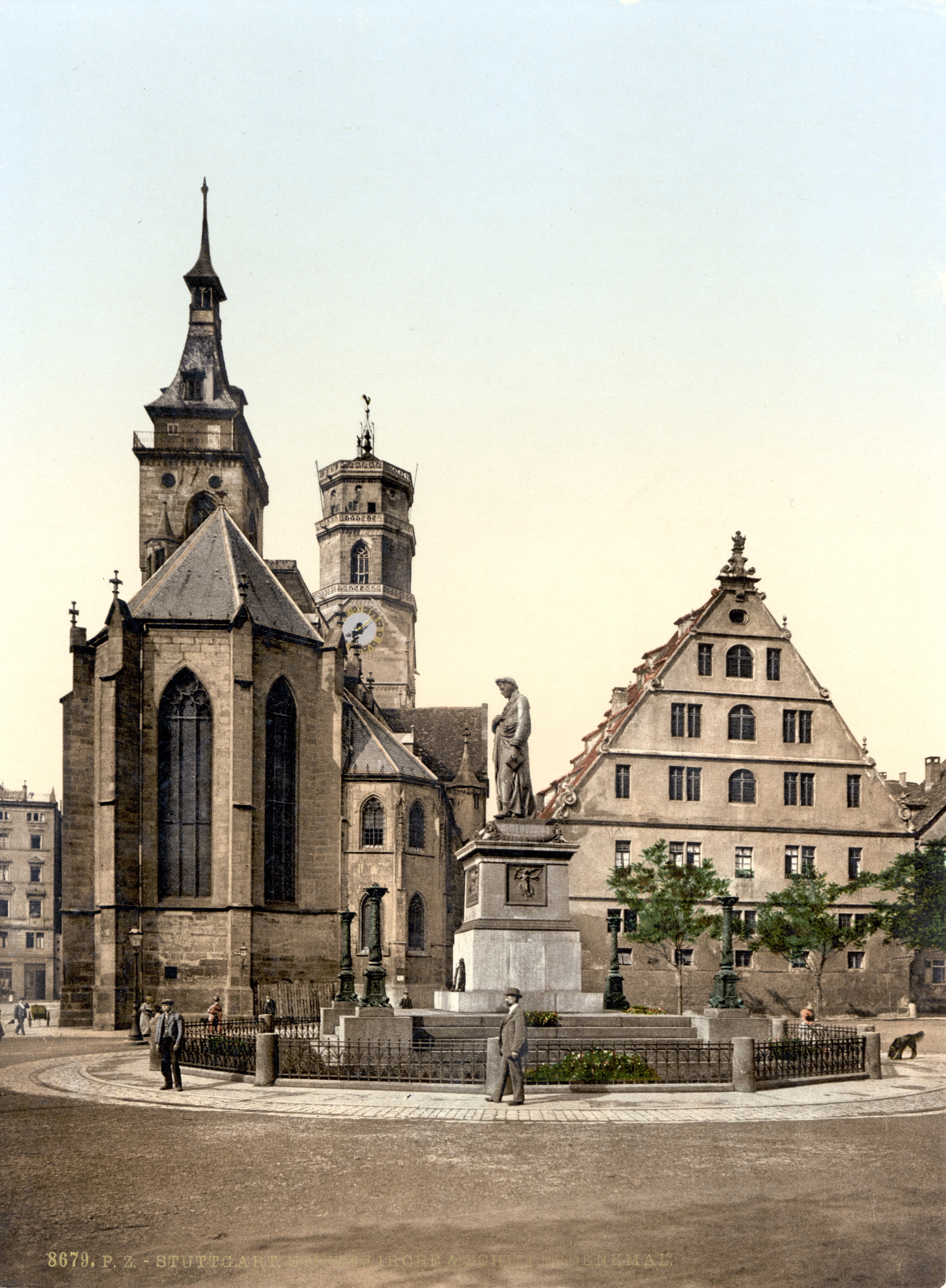
The Protestant Stiftskirche (originally built in 1170, pictured c. 1900) with the memorial on Schillerplatz square in foreground

Stuttgart is known for its rich cultural heritage, in particular its State Theatre (Staatstheater) and State Gallery (Staatsgalerie). The Staatstheater is home to the State opera and three smaller theatres. It regularly stages opera, ballet and theatre productions as well as concerts. The Staatstheater was named Germany/Austria/Switzerland "Theatre of the year" in 2006; the Stuttgart Opera has won the 'Opera of the year' award six times. Stuttgart Ballet is connected to names like John Cranko and Marcia Haydée.

Stuttgart is also home to one of Germany's most prestigious symphony orchestras, the Stuttgart Radio Symphony Orchestra, with famous English conductor Sir Roger Norrington, who developed a distinct sound of that orchestra, known as the Stuttgart Sound. They mostly perform in the Liederhalle concert hall.

The city offers two Broadway-style musical theatres, the Apollo and the Palladium Theater (each approx. 1800 seats). Ludwigsburg Palace in the nearby town of Ludwigsburg is also used throughout the year as a venue for concerts and cultural events.

As a result of Stuttgart's long history of viticulture (even today there are vineyards less than 500 m (1,640 ft) from the Main Station), there are more than 400 flights of stairs (known in the local dialect as the "Stäffele") around the city, equivalent to approximately 20 km (12 mi) of steps. Later, in the early 19th century, the city continued to grow and many vineyards were replaced by houses and streets and the Stäffele were used as footpaths to connect the newly built neighborhoods. Some of the stairs were elaborately decorated with fountains and plantings.

The Schleyerhalle sports arena is regularly used to stage rock and pop concerts with major international stars on European tour.

Stuttgart's Swabian cuisine, beer and wine have been produced in the area since the 17th century and are now famous throughout Germany and beyond. For example, Gaisburger Marsch is a stew that was invented in Stuttgart's Gaisburg area of Stuttgart East.

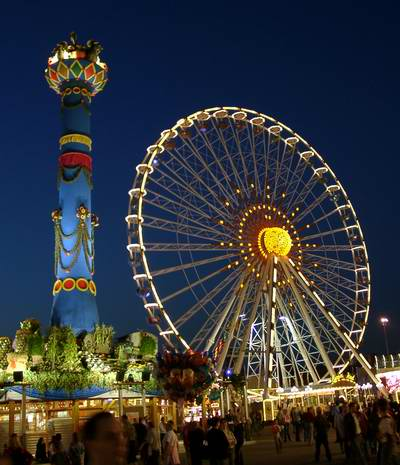
The Cannstatter Volksfest in the district of 'Bad Cannstatt'

In October 2009 the Stuttgart Ministry of Agriculture announced that the European Union was to officially recognise the pasta dish Maultaschen as a "regional specialty", thus marking its significance to the cultural heritage of Baden-Württemberg.

In 1993 Stuttgart hosted the International Garden Show in the suburb of Killesberg. In 2006 it was also one of the host cities of the Football World Cup. In 2007, Stuttgart hosted the 2007 World Artistic Gymnastics Championships. In 2008 it was host to the World Individual Debating and Public Speaking Championships. In 2015, Stuttgart hosted the Protestant Kirchentag (church convention) festival, a festival that takes place in a different German city every two years.

Regular events that take place in Stuttgart:

- The world-famous annual 'Volksfest', originally a traditional agricultural fair which now also hosts beer tents and a French village and is second in size only to the Oktoberfest in Munich. There is also a Spring festival on the same grounds in April of each year.
- With more than 3.6 million visitors in 2007 and more than 200 stands, Stuttgart's Christmas Market, running from late November to 23 December, is the largest and one of the oldest traditional Christmas markets in Europe. It is especially renowned for its abundant decorations and takes place in the four weeks leading up to Christmas.
- The Fish Market (Hamburger Fischmarkt, late July) with fresh fish, other food and beer from Hamburg
- The Summer Festival (Stuttgart Sommerfest, usually in early August) with shows, music, children's entertainment and local cuisine in Schlossplatz, Stuttgart and adjacent parks
- The Lantern Festival (Lichterfest, early July) in Killesberg park with its famous firework display and fairground attractions
- The Wine Village (Weindorf, late August/early September) – vintages are sold at this event held at Schillerplatz and Marktplatz (Market Square).

=== Museums ===
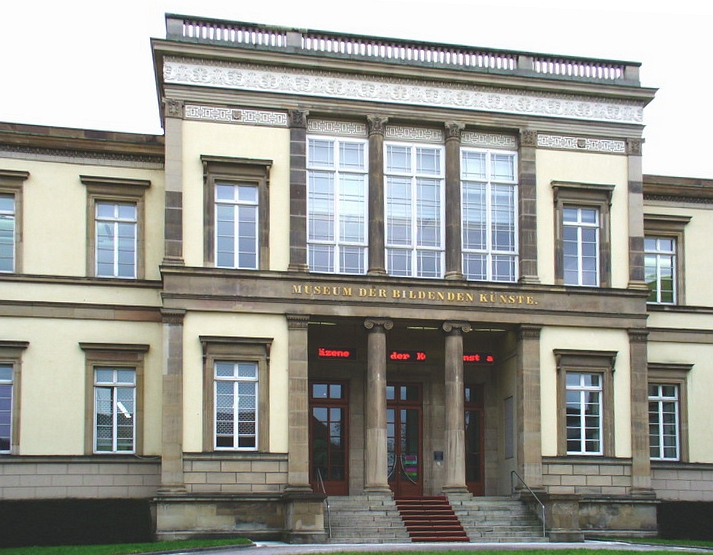
Entrance to the Old State Gallery

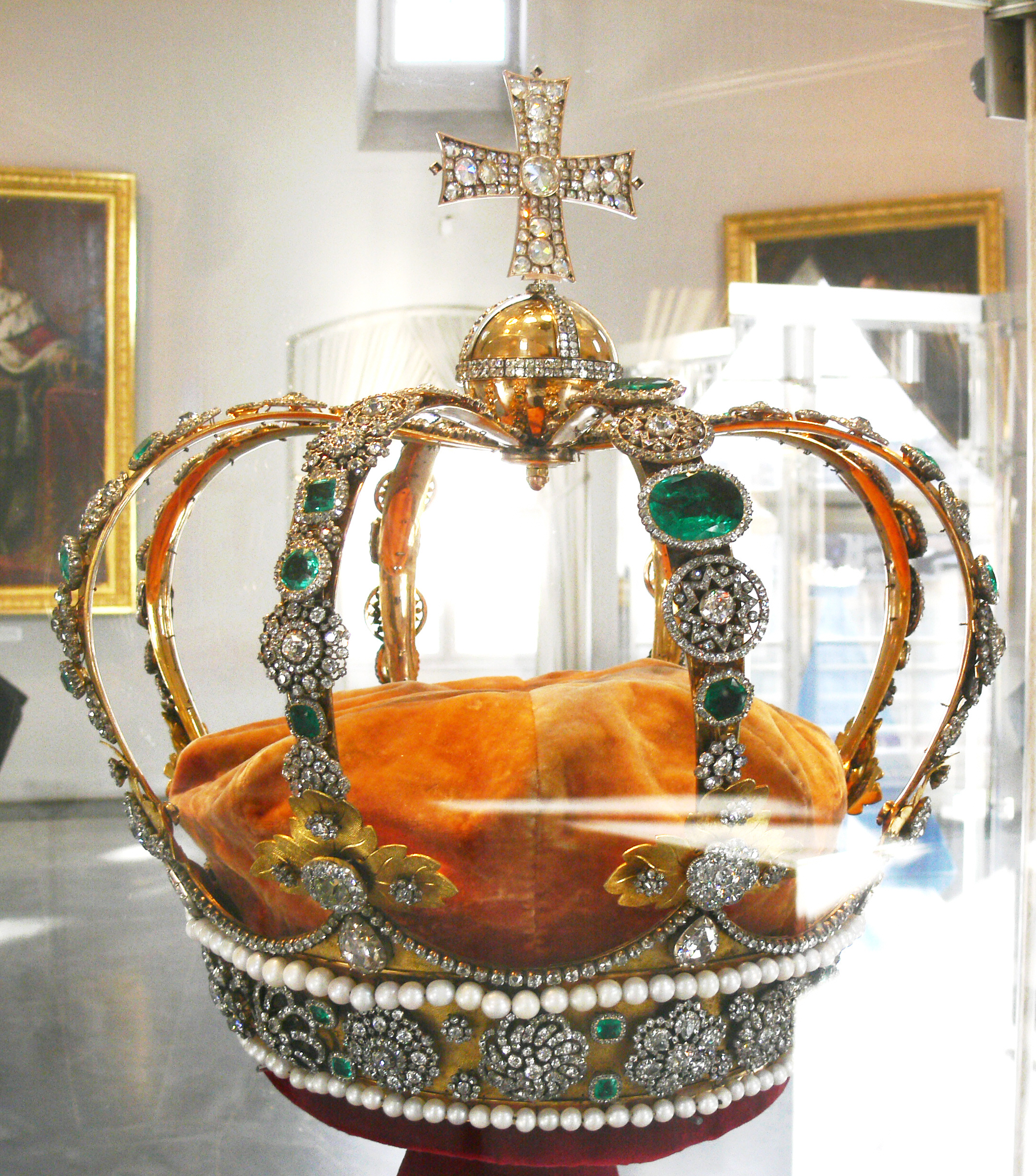
The Württemberg crown jewels on display in the State Museum of Württemberg (Old Castle)

Stuttgart is home to five of the eleven state museums in Baden-Württemberg. The foremost of these is the Old State Gallery (opened in 1843, extended in 1984) which holds art dating from the 14th to 19th century including works by Rubens, Rembrandt, Monet, Renoir, Cézanne and Beuys. Next door to the Old State Gallery is the New State Gallery (1980) with its controversial modern architecture. Among others, this gallery houses works from Max Beckmann, Dalí, Matisse, Miró, Picasso, Klee, Chagall and Kandinsky.

The Old Castle is also home to the State Museum of Württemberg which was founded in 1862 by William I of Württemberg. The museum traces the rich history of Württemberg with many artifacts from its dukes, counts and kings, as well as earlier remnants dating back to the Stone Age. On the Karlsplatz side of the Old Castle is a museum dedicated to the memory of Claus Schenk Graf von Stauffenberg, former resident of Stuttgart who attempted to assassinate Adolf Hitler on 20 July 1944.

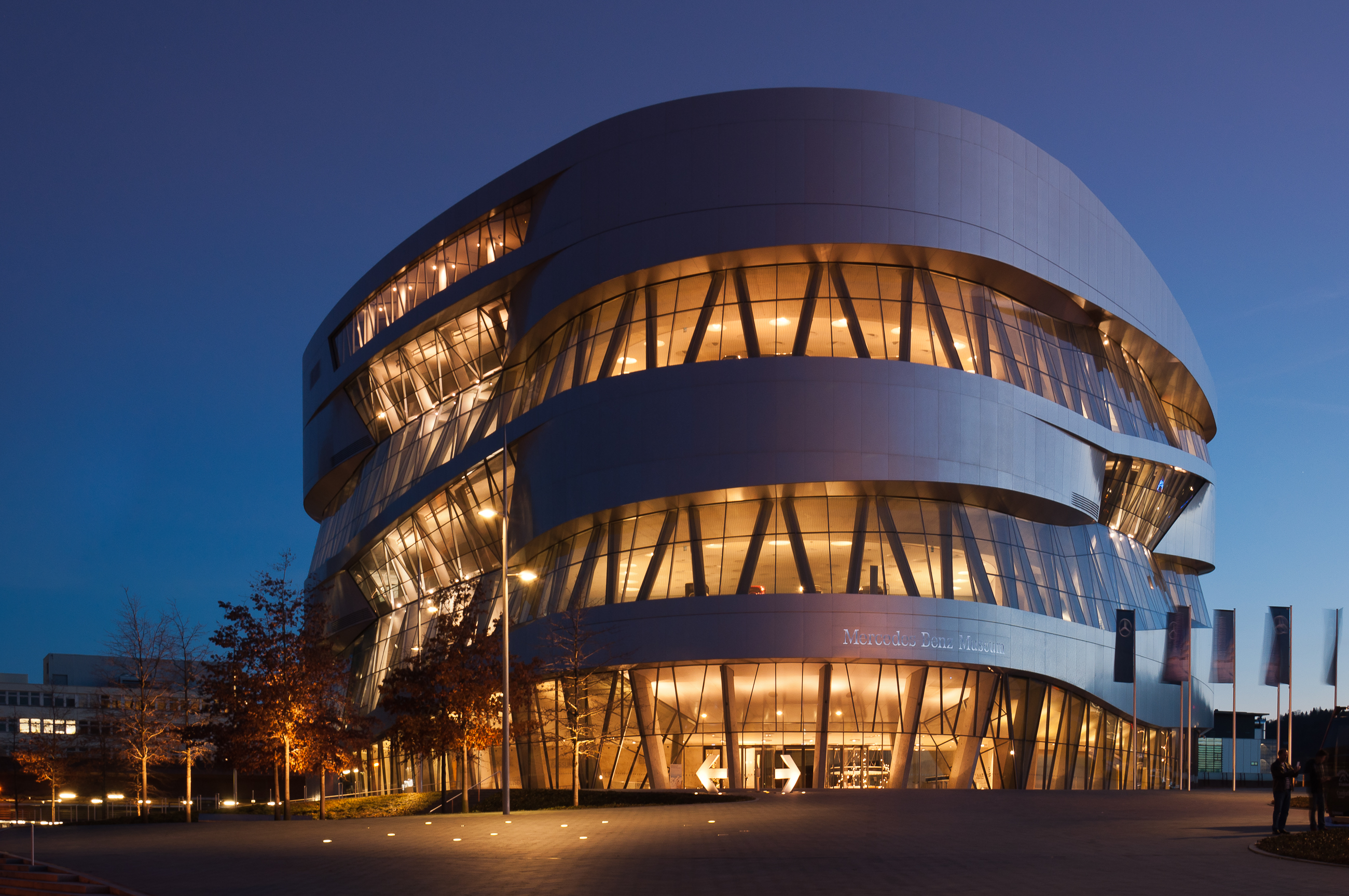
Mercedes-Benz Museum

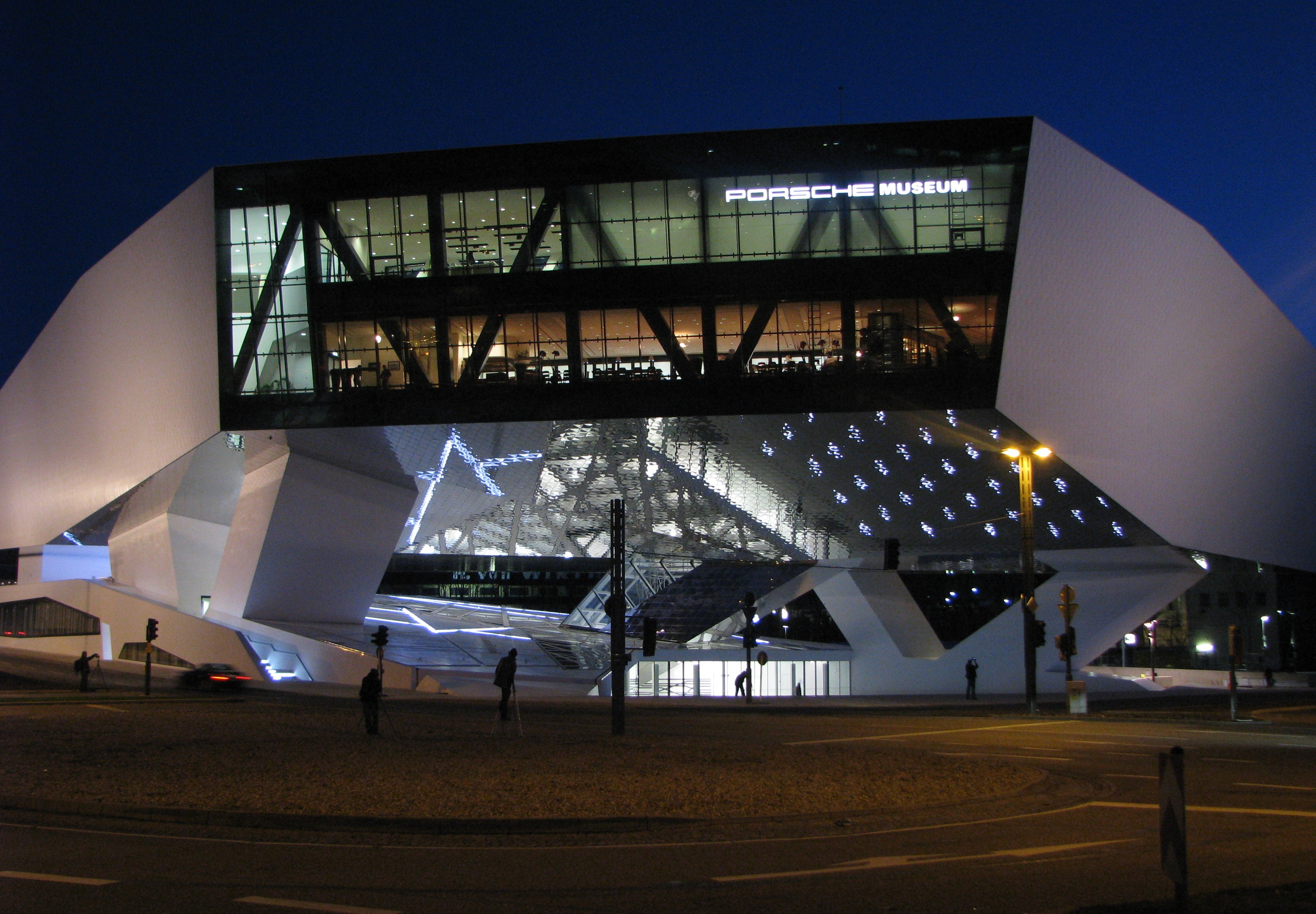
Porsche Museum

Other leading museums in Stuttgart include:

- The History Museum (Haus der Geschichte, 1987), examining local history, finds, the conflict between modern society and its cultural history
- State Museum of Natural History Stuttgart (SMNS) in Park Rosenstein housed in Castle Rosenstein (with an emphasis on biology and natural history) and Löwentor Museum (paleontology and geology, home of the Steinheim skull and many unique fossils from the triassic, jurassic and tertiary periods)
- The Mercedes-Benz Museum (1936, moved in 2006), now the most visited museum in Stuttgart (440,000 visits per year). The museum traces the 125-year history of the automobile from the legendary silver arrow to the Mercedes-Benz brand of today.
- Stuttgart Art Museum (Kunstmuseum Stuttgart, 2005), the number two museum in Stuttgart in terms of visitors with a strong leaning towards modern art (the foremost exhibition of Otto Dix works). The museum stands on the corner of Schlossplatz, Stuttgart in a huge glass cube, in strong contrast to the surrounding traditional architecture.
- The Porsche Museum (1976; reopened in 2008 on new premises)
- Hegel House (Hegelhaus), birthplace of the philosopher Georg Wilhelm Friedrich Hegel which documents his life works
- The Linden Museum, established in 1911, a leading international ethnological museum
- Stuttgart Tram Museum (Straßenbahnwelt Stuttgart) in Bad Cannstatt, a display of historical vehicles dating back to 1868
- Theodor Heuss House (Theodor-Heuss-Haus, 2002) in Killesbergpark, a tribute to the life and times of the former German president
- The North Station Memorial (Gedenkstätte am Nordbahnhof Stuttgart) in memory of the 2000 or so Jewish holocaust victims deported by the Nazis from the now disused North Station

=== Churches ===
Stuttgart is the seat of a Protestant bishop (Protestant State Church in Württemberg) and one of the two co-seats of the bishop of the Roman Catholic Diocese of Rottenburg-Stuttgart. The Stuttgart-based Pentecostal Gospel Forum is the largest place of worship (megachurch) in Germany. It is also home to a large English speaking church, The International Baptist Church of Stuttgart.

=== Libraries ===
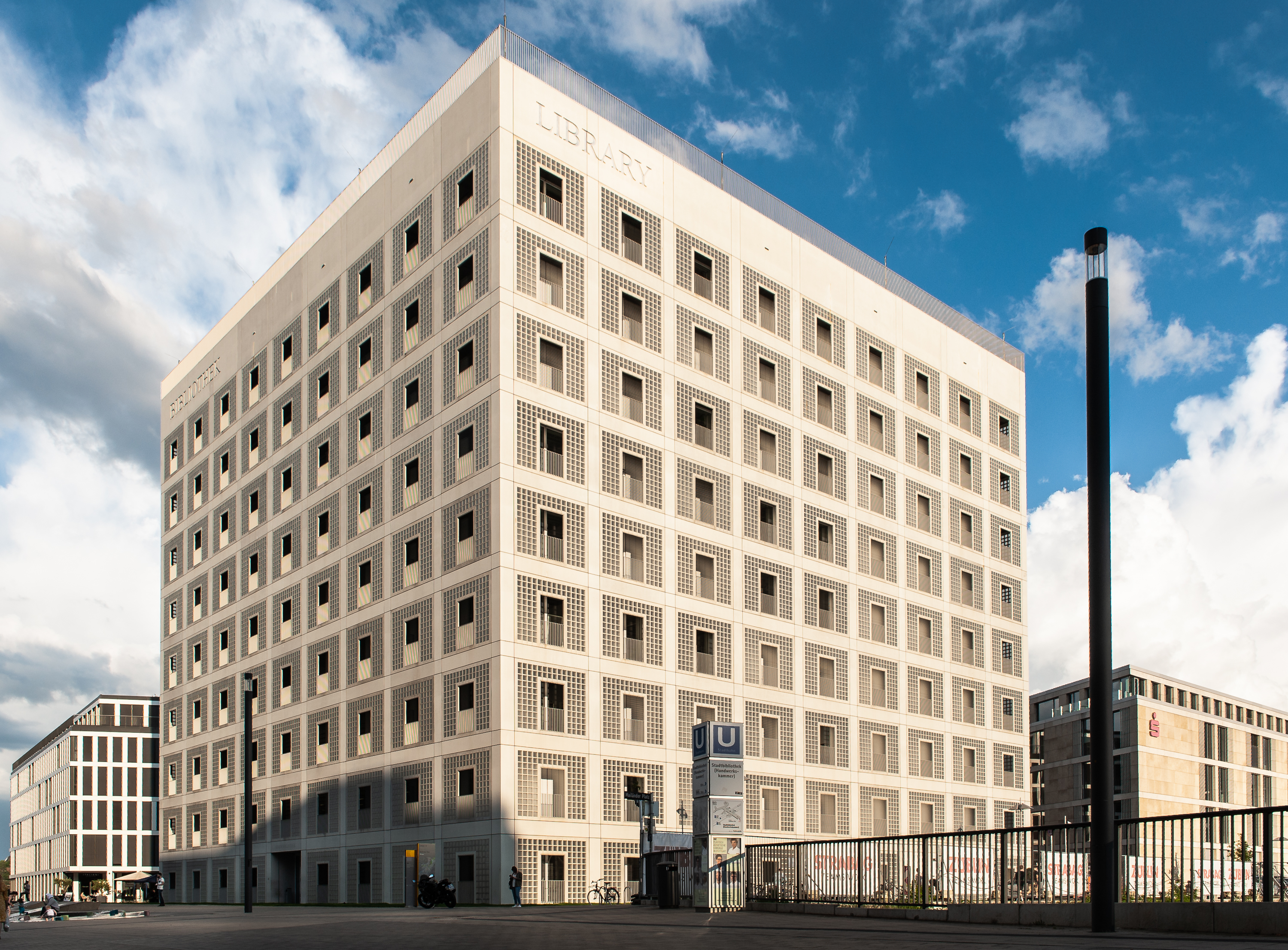
City Library

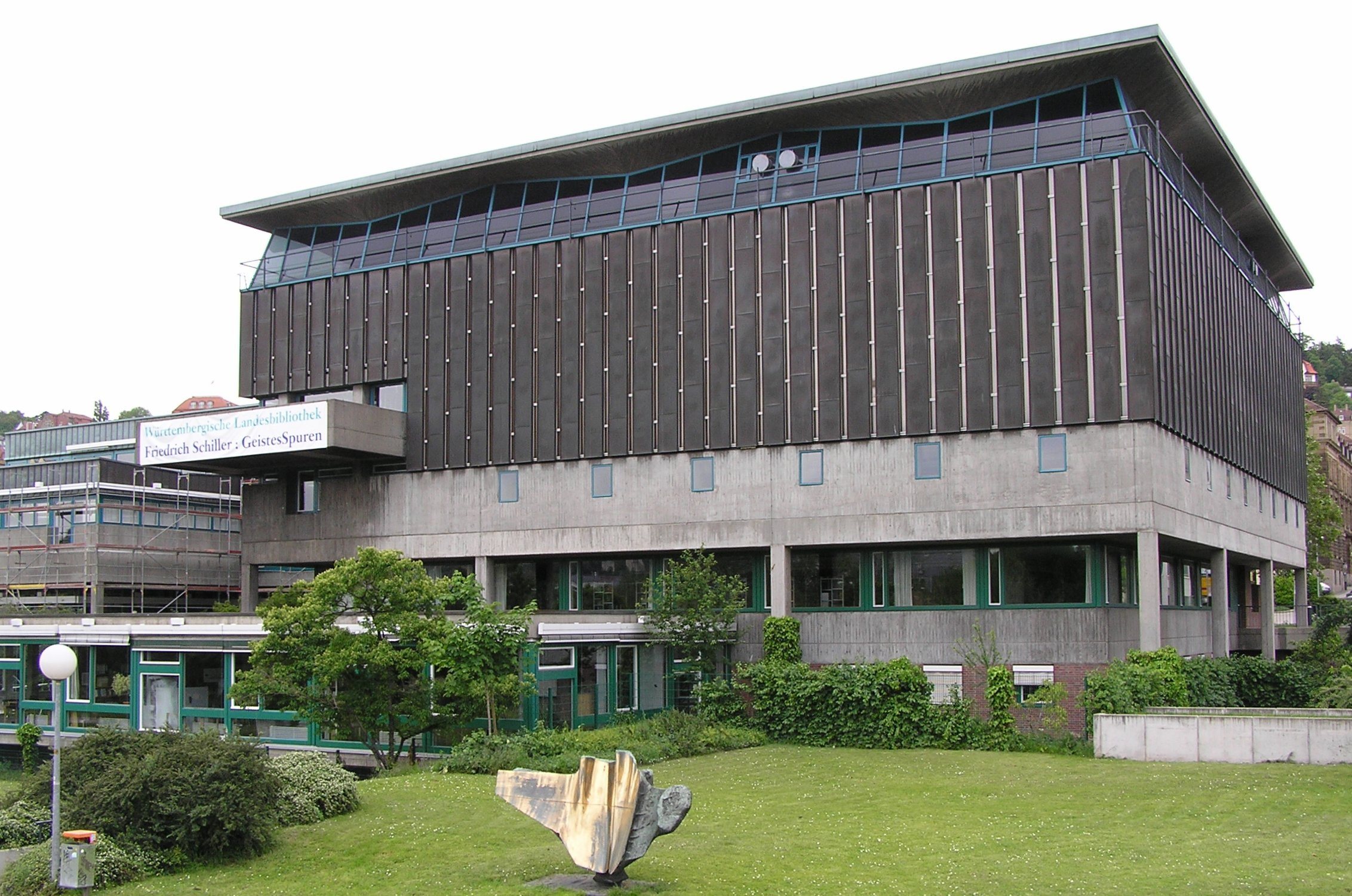
State Library of Wurttemberg

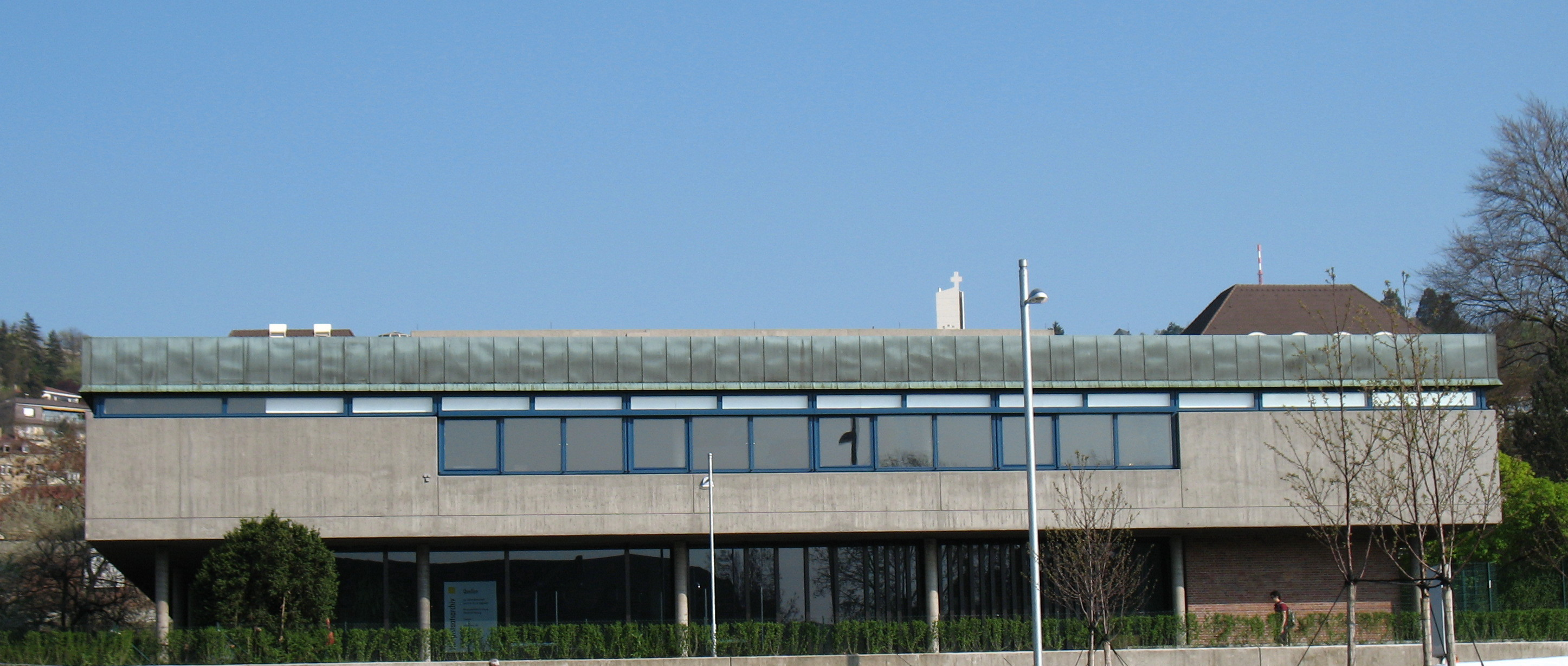
Central State Archive

The Württembergische Landesbibliothek (WLB) is one of two state libraries for Baden-Württemberg. The WLB is specifically responsible for the administrative regions of Stuttgart and Tübingen. Especially devoted to the National Library of acquiring, cataloging, archiving and provision of literature about Württemberg, called Württembergica. Together with the Badische Landesbibliothek (BLB) in Karlsruhe it also has the legal deposit for Baden-Württemberg, making it an archive library.

The Stuttgart University Library (UBS) is a central institution of the University of Stuttgart. It forms the center of the library system of the university, ensuring the supply of research, teaching and studies with literature and other information resources. It stands next to the members of the university and citizens of the city are available. Together with other research libraries and documentation centers in the Stuttgart area – such as the University of Hohenheim Library – it forms the UBS Library Information System of the Stuttgart Region (BISS).

The Central State Archive Stuttgart is the archive in charge of the Ministries of the State of Baden-Württemberg. Since 1965, it is located right next to the WLB and belongs since 2005 as a department of the Landesarchiv Baden-Württemberg in. It includes the stocks of the county and the duchy Württemberg until 1806, the Württemberg central authorities of the 19th and 20th century and the early 19th century as a result of media coverage of fallen Württemberg gentlemen and imperial cities in South Württemberg.

The Stadtarchiv Stuttgart is the archive in charge of the provincial capital Stuttgart. The archived material is in principle open to the public and can be consulted in the reading room in Bellingweg 21 in Bad Cannstatt.

The Landeskirchliche Archives preserve the stocks of the Württemberg church leaders and of other ecclesial bodies and institutions: the ducal and royal Württemberg consistory, the Evangelical Supreme Ecclesiastical Council, deanery and parish archives, educational institutions, the works and associations as well as estates and collections. It also has the microfilms of all church books (especially baptism, marriage, and family Death's Register) in the area of the Evangelical-Lutheran Church in Württemberg.

The "Archive instigator" is dedicated to the dead of the city. Since 2005, the instigators are working on a memoir about "The dead town". So far, about 5,000 names of victims of the regime of National Socialism have been acquired.

There are two large tours that are available to visitors to Stuttgart. The first is the Hop-on Hop-off bus tour (also called the CityTour Stuttgart), lasting from 10 AM to 4 PM that takes visitors around the city. The other is the Neckar-Käpt'n, only available from May to October, which cruises on the Neckar river from its dock at Wilhelma in Bad Cannstatt.

== Demographics ==
Historical population
Year	Pop.	±%
1400	4,000	—
1707	16,000	+300.0%
1837	36,041	+125.3%
1900	166,699	+362.5%
1920	315,796	+89.4%
1930	377,461	+19.5%
1940	454,600	+20.4%
1950	497,677	+9.5%
1961	637,539	+28.1%
1971	632,947	−0.7%
1981	583,001	−7.9%
1991	579,988	−0.5%
2001	587,152	+1.2%
2011	585,890	−0.2%
2022	610,458	+4.2%
Population size may be affected by changes in administrative divisions. Source:

Stuttgart has a population of about 630,000 and is the 6th largest city in Germany. Stuttgart reached its population peak of over 100,000 in 1874. In 1946, when Stuttgart became the capital of Baden-Württemberg state, it had a population of about 415,000. In the 1960s, the industrialization boomed in Stuttgart due to its automobile companies Mercedes-Benz and Porsche and other companies came to Stuttgart. It also saw the growth of foreign population, mostly from Turkey, Greece, India, Italy and former Yugoslavian countries. The population of Stuttgart has not changed much since then because of the city's high rents, which have led many people to move to neighbouring municipalities.

Largest groups of foreign residents, 2022
Nationality	Population
Turkey	17,900
Croatia	15,468
Italy	14,021
Greece	13,757
Ukraine	8,138
Romania	6,121
Serbia	5,844
Bosnia and Herzegovina	4,963
Syria	4,585
Portugal	4,172
Poland	4,162
India	3,624
Kosovo	3,363
Spain	3,233
France	3,212
China	3,134
Iraq	3,099
Bulgaria	3,041
Hungary	2,738
Austria	2,643

=== Immigrants ===
More than half of the population today is not of Swabian background, as many non-Swabian Germans have moved here due to the employment situation, which is far better than in most areas of Germany. Since the 1960s, many foreigners have also immigrated to Stuttgart to work here (as part of the "Gastarbeiter" program); another wave of immigrants came as refugees from the Wars in Yugoslavia in the 1990s. Thus, as of 2022, 47% of the city's population is of foreign background. In 2000, 22.8% of the population did not hold German citizenship, in 2022 this had increased to 27.6%. By end of 2018 the largest groups of foreign nationals were Turks (17,900), Greeks (13,757), Italians (14,021), Croats (15,268), Serbs (5,844) followed by immigrants from Romania, Bosnia and Herzegovina, Portugal, Poland, France, Austria, Morocco and Cameroon. 39% of foreign nationals come from the European Union (mostly Italy, Greece, and Poland).

=== Religion ===
The religious landscape in Stuttgart changed in 1534 as a direct result of the Reformation. Since this time Württemberg has been predominantly Protestant. However, since 1975 the number of Protestants in Stuttgart has dropped from around 300,000 to 200,000. In 2014, 26.2% of inhabitants were Protestant and 24.0% were Roman Catholic. 49.8% of the population fell into other categories: Muslims, Jews and those who either followed no religion or one not accounted for in official statistics.

=== Unemployment ===
Unemployment in the Stuttgart Region is above the average of Baden-Württemberg, but very low compared to other metropolitan areas in Germany. In November 2008, before the annual winter rise, unemployment in the Stuttgart Region stood at 3.8%, 0.1% lower than the rate for Baden-Württemberg, in February 2009 it was 4.7%. Unemployment in the actual city of Stuttgart during the same periods stood at 5.2% and 6.0% (8 November and 9 February respectively). By comparison: unemployment for the whole of Germany stood at 7.1% (8 Nov) and 8.5% (9 Feb).

=== Crime rates ===
Stuttgart ranks as one of the safest cities in Germany. In 2003, 8535 crimes were committed in Stuttgart for every 100,000 inhabitants (versus the average for all German cities of 12,751). Figures for 2006 indicate that Stuttgart ranked second behind Munich. 60% of Stuttgart crimes were solved in 2003, ranking second behind Nuremberg.

== Government and politics ==
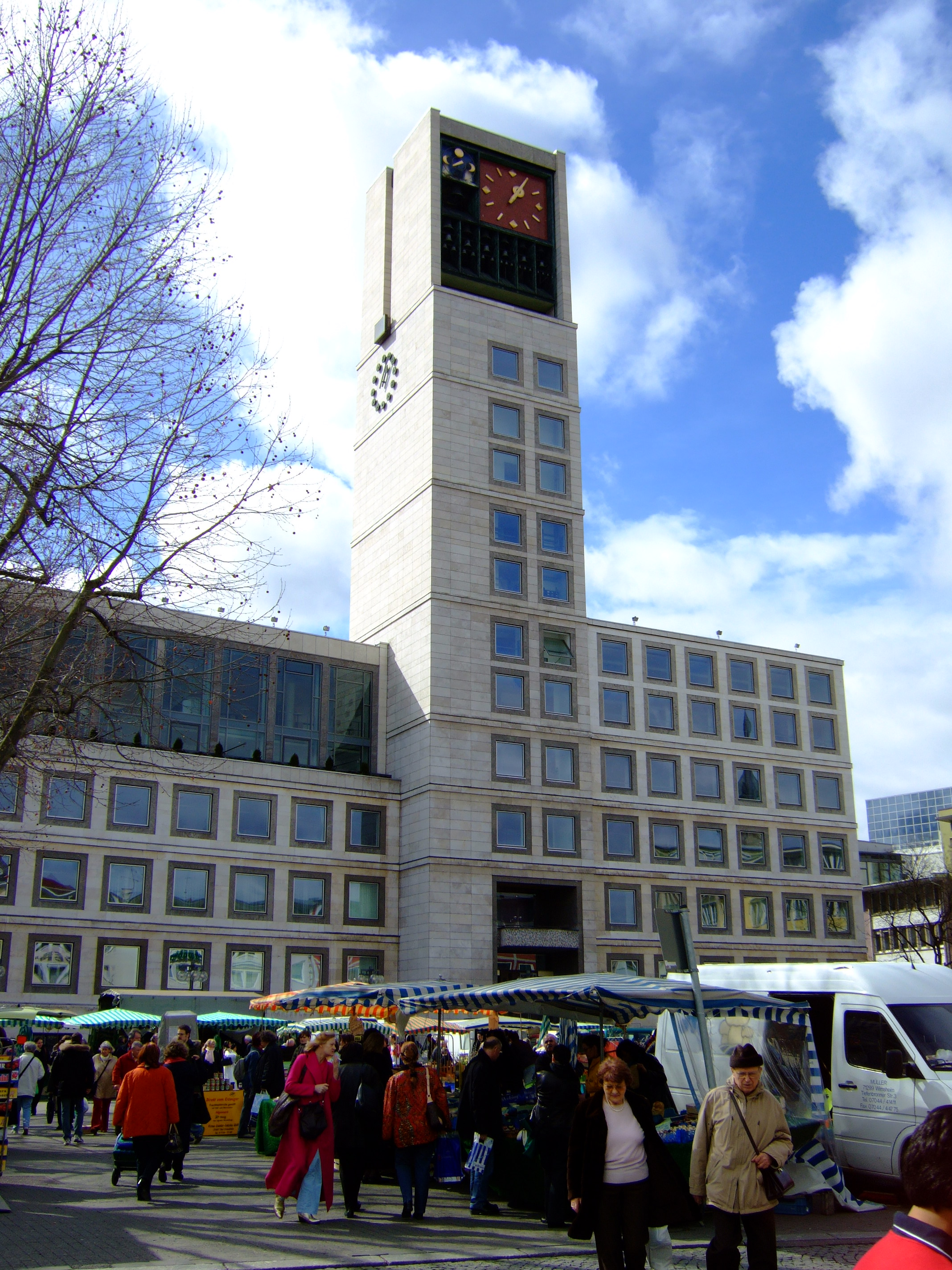
Stuttgart Town Hall (Rathaus)

When Stuttgart was run as a (or within) the Duchy of Württemberg, it was governed by a type of protectorate called a Vogt appointed by the Duke. After 1811 this role was fulfilled by a City Director or 'Stadtdirektor'. After 1819 the community elected its own community mayor or 'Schultheiß'. Since 1930 the title of Oberbürgermeister (the nearest equivalent of which would be an executive form of lord mayor in English) has applied to Stuttgart and all other Württemberg towns of more than 20,000 inhabitants.

At the end of the Second World War, French administrators appointed the independent politician Arnulf Klett as Burgomaster, a role he fulfilled without interruption until his death in 1974. Since this time Stuttgart has mainly been governed by the CDU. One former mayor was Manfred Rommel (son of perhaps the most famous German field marshal of World War II, Erwin Rommel).

As the capital of Baden-Württemberg, Stuttgart is an important political centre in Germany and the seat of the State Parliament, or Landtag as well as all Baden-Württemberg state departments.

In June 2009, for the first time the Greens gained the most seats in a German city with more than 500,000 inhabitants, effectively changing the balance of power in the city council. For the first time since 1972 the CDU no longer held the most seats, toppling its absolute majority shared with the Independent Party and the FDP. According to the German newspaper Die Welt, the main reason for the Greens' victory was disgruntlement with the controversial Stuttgart 21 rail project.

=== Mayor ===
Results of the second round of the 2020 mayoral election

The current mayor of Stuttgart is Frank Nopper of the Christian Democratic Union (CDU) since 2020. The most recent mayoral election was held on 8 November 2020, with a runoff held on 29 November, and the results were as follows:

Candidate	Party	First round		Second round	
Candidate	Party	Votes	%	Votes	%
Frank Nopper	Christian Democratic Union	69,338	31.8	83,812	42.3
Veronika Kienzle	Alliance 90/The Greens	37,620	17.2	Withdrew	
Marian Schreier	Independent (SPD)	32,678	15.0	73,209	36.9
Hannes Rockenbauch	Independent (Left/SÖS/Pirate/DiB)	30,465	14.0	35,349	17.8
Martin Körner	Social Democratic Party	21,281	9.8	Withdrew	
Sebastian Reutter	Independent	9,494	4.4	Withdrew	
Michael Ballweg	Independent	5,687	2.6	2,439	1.2
Malte Kaufmann	Alternative for Germany	4,712	2.2	Withdrew	
Ralph Schertlen	Independent	2,113	1.0	1,183	0.6
John Heer	Independent	1,774	0.8	Withdrew	
Nili Widerker	Independent	1,322	0.6	770	0.4
Marco Völker	Independent	734	0.3	392	0.2
Friedhild Anni Miller	Independent	722	0.3	616	0.3
Werner Ressdorf	Independent	143	0.1	114	0.1
Other		40	0.0	266	0.1
Valid votes		218,123	99.8	198,150	99.6
Invalid votes		540	0.2	751	0.4
Total		218,663	100.0	198,901	100.0
Electorate/voter turnout		446,375	49.0	445,577	44.5
Source: City of Stuttgart (1st round, 2nd round)

=== City council ===
The Stuttgart city council governs the city alongside the Mayor. The most recent city council election was held on 9 June 2024, and the results were as follows:

Party	Votes	%	+/-	Seats	+/-
Christian Democratic Union (CDU)	3,171,829	23.4	▲4.0	14	▲3
Alliance 90/The Greens (Grüne)	3,108,129	22.9	▼3.4	14	▼2
Social Democratic Party (SPD)	1,510,248	11.1	▼0.5	7	0
Alternative for Germany (AfD)	1,123,835	8.3	▲2.2	5	▲1
Free Democratic Party (FDP)	1,001,837	7.4	▼0.5	4	▼1
Free Voters Baden-Württemberg (FW)	839,576	6.2	▼0.9	4	0
The Left (Die Linke)	608,218	4.5	▼0.8	3	0
Stuttgart Ecological Social (SÖS)	562,541	4.1	▼0.3	2	▼1
Volt Germany (Volt)	386,158	2.8	New	2	New
City People (Stadtisten)	263,983	1.9	▼0.6	1	▼1
Die PARTEI (PARTEI)	214,257	1.6	▲0.1	1	0
Climate List Baden-Württemberg (Klima)	180,150	1.3	New	1	New
Animal Protection Party (Tierschutz)	160,855	1.2	▲0.2	1	0
Stuttgarter List	116,110	0.9	New	0	New
Diversity (Vielfalt)	112,314	0.8	New	0	New
Ecological Democratic Party (ÖDP)	93,061	0.7	0.0	0	0
Feminist List (FeLi)	60,131	0.4	▲0.2	0	0
Children First	59,375	0.4	New	0	New
Valid ballots	244,771	100.0			
Invalid ballots	5,620	2.2			
Total	250,391	100.0		60	±0
Electorate/voter turnout	433,626	57.7	▲0.2		
Source: City of Stuttgart

=== City districts ===
The city of Stuttgart is administratively divided into 23 city districts – five "inner" districts and 18 "outer" districts. Each district has a council headed by a district director. From there, the districts are broken down into quarters. Since the changes in city statutes on 1 July 2007 and 1 January 2009, the total number of quarters rose to 152.

The 23 city districts and their quarters Inner Districts Stuttgart-Center (10), Stuttgart-North (11), Stuttgart-East (8), Stuttgart-South (7), Stuttgart-West (9) Outer Districts Bad Cannstatt (18), Birkach (3), Botnang (4), Degerloch (5), Feuerbach (8), Hedelfingen (4), Möhringen (9), Mühlhausen (5), Münster (1), Obertürkheim (2), Plieningen (5), Sillenbuch (3), Stammheim (2), Untertürkheim (8), Vaihingen (12), Wangen (1), Weilimdorf (6), Zuffenhausen (11)	Click me! Municipalities and Districts of Stuttgart

== Economy ==
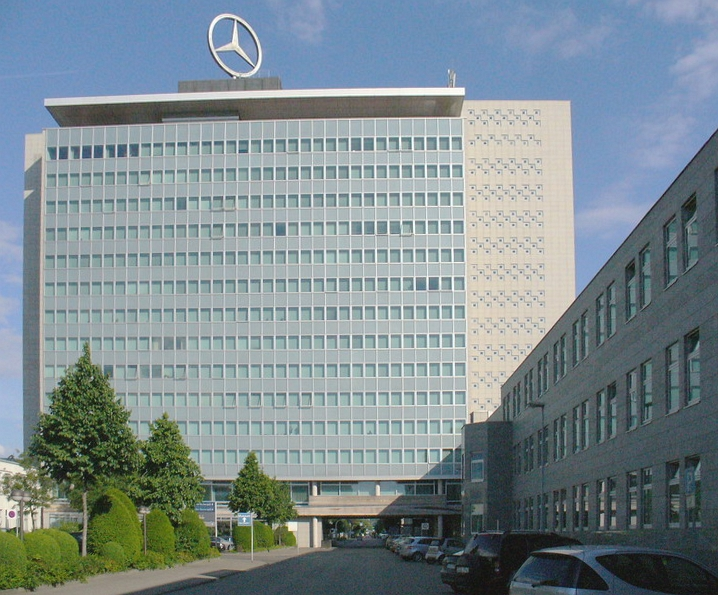
Headquarters of Mercedes-Benz Group in Stuttgart

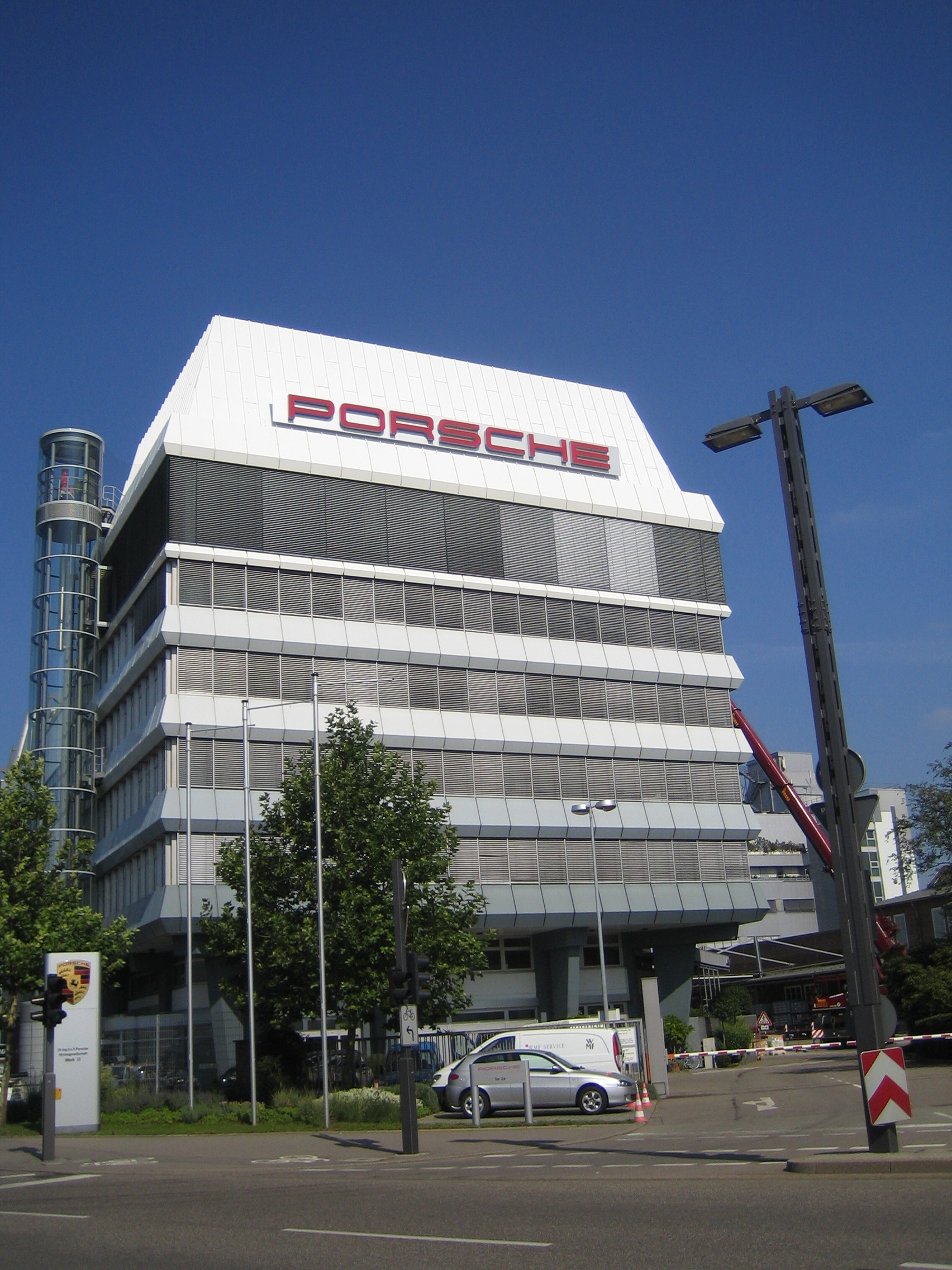
Headquarters of Porsche in Stuttgart

The Stuttgart area is known for its high-tech industry. Companies include Mercedes-Benz Group, Porsche, Robert Bosch GmbH, McKesson Europe, Hewlett-Packard, IBM, and Sika AG – all of whom have their world or European headquarters here.

Stuttgart is home to Germany's ninth biggest exhibition center, Stuttgart Trade Fair, which lies on the city outskirts next to Stuttgart Airport. Hundreds of SMEs are still based in Stuttgart (often termed Mittelstand), many still in family ownership with strong ties to the automotive, electronics, engineering and high-tech industry. Examples include Recaro, LAPP, Dürr and Leitz

=== The cradle of the automobile ===
The automobile and motorcycle were purported to have been invented in Stuttgart (by Karl Benz and subsequently industrialized in 1887 by Gottlieb Daimler and Wilhelm Maybach at the Daimler Motoren Gesellschaft). As a result, it is considered to be the starting point of the worldwide automotive industry and is sometimes referred to as the 'cradle of the automobile'. Today, Mercedes-Benz and Porsche both have their headquarters in Stuttgart, as well as automotive parts giants Bosch and Mahle. A number of auto-enthusiast magazines are published in Stuttgart.

=== Science and research and development ===
The region currently has Germany's highest density of scientific, academic and research organisations. No other region in Germany registers so many patents and designs as Stuttgart. 45% of Baden-Württemberg's R&D capacities are concentrated in the Swabian capital. More than 11% of all German R&D costs are invested in the Stuttgart region (approximately 4.3 billion euros per year). In addition to several universities and colleges (e.g. University of Stuttgart, University of Hohenheim, Stuttgart Institute of Management and Technology and several Stuttgart Universities of Applied Sciences), the area is home to six Fraunhofer institutes, four institutes of collaborative industrial research at local universities, two Max-Planck institutes and a major establishment of the German Aerospace Centre (DLR).

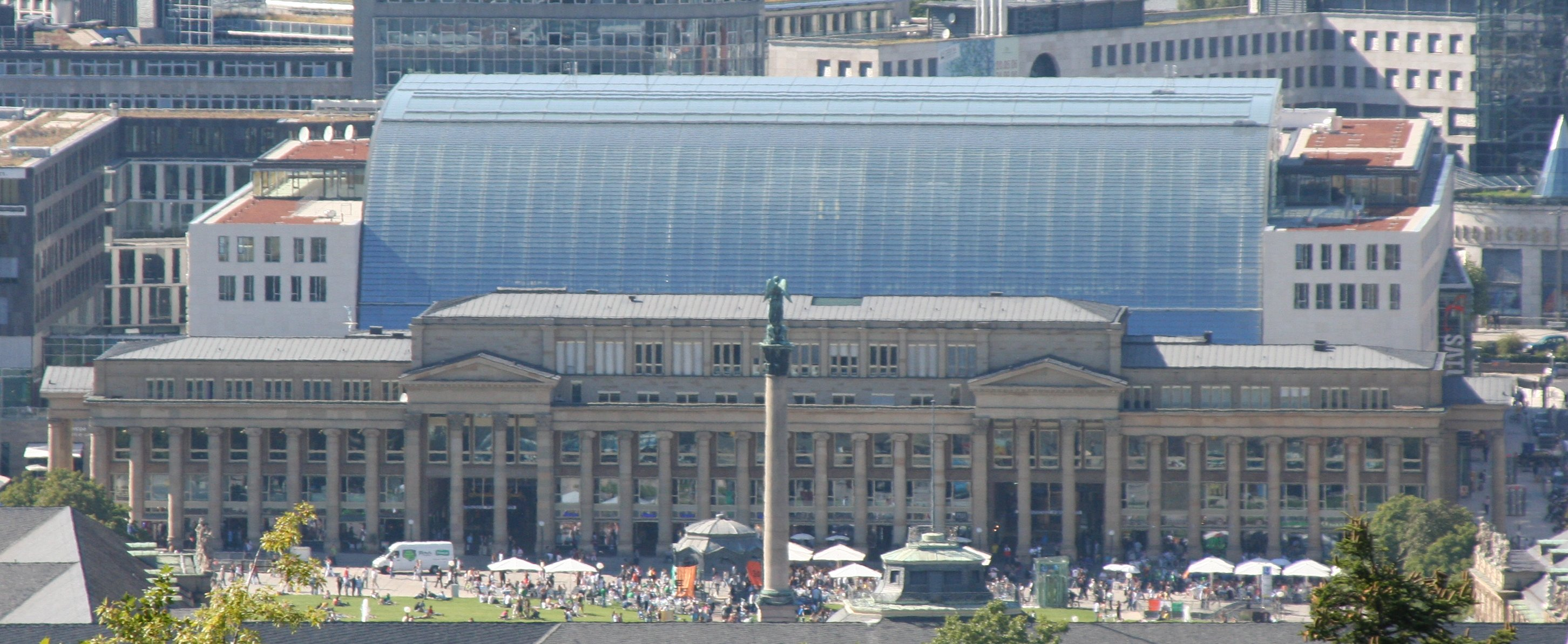
The 'Königsbau' on Schlossplatz, former home of the Stuttgart Stock Exchange

=== Financial services ===
The Stuttgart Stock Exchange is the second largest in Germany (after Frankfurt). Many leading companies in the financial services sector are headquartered in Stuttgart with around 100 credit institutes in total (e.g. LBBW Bank, Wüstenrot & Württembergische, Allianz Life Assurance).

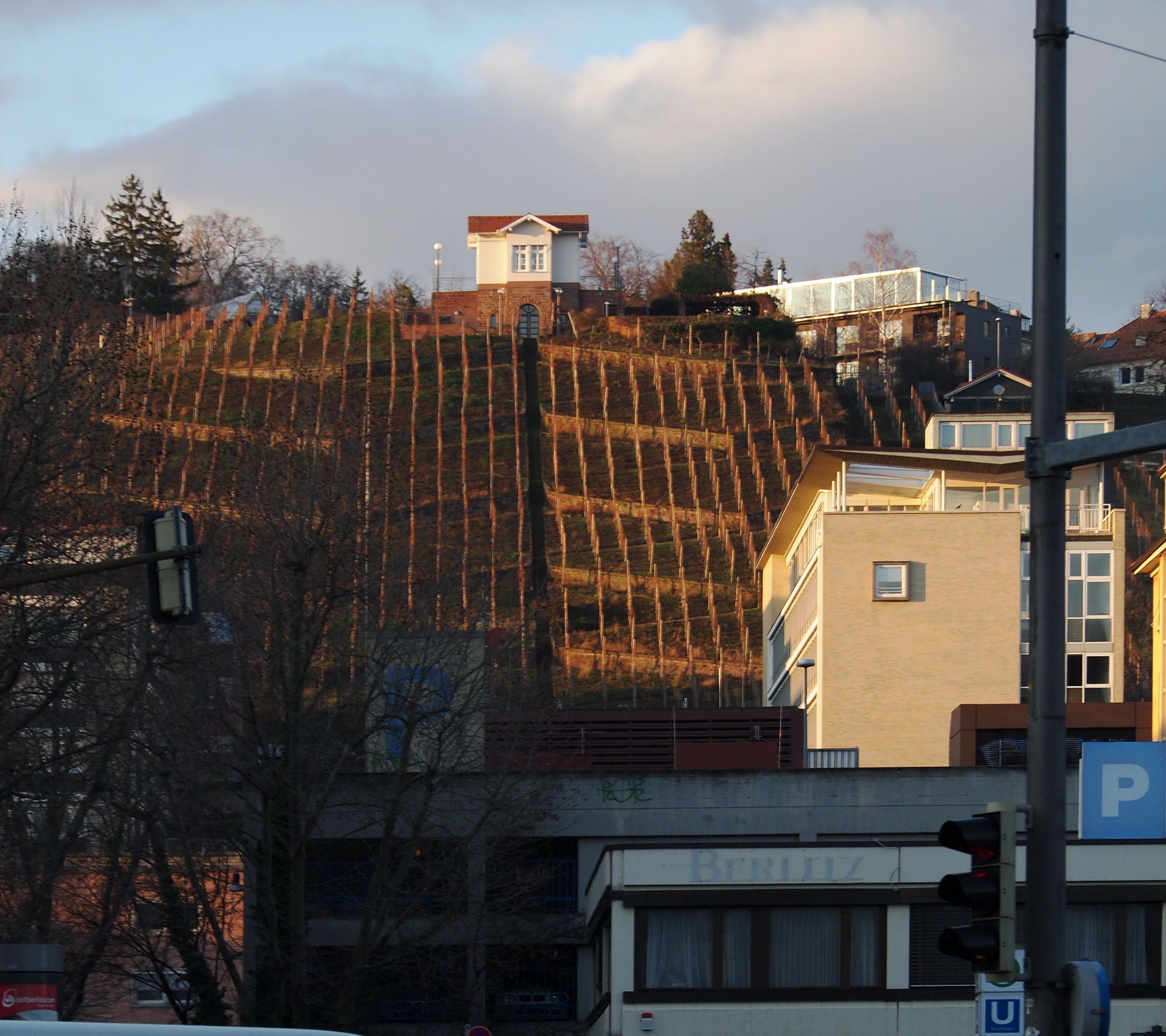
Kriegsberg vineyard in the city center

=== A history of wine and beer ===
Stuttgart is the only city in Germany where wine grapes are grown within the urban area, mainly in the districts of Rotenberg, Uhlbach and Untertürkheim.

Wine-growing in the area dates back to 1108 when, according to State archives, Blaubeuren Abbey was given vineyards in Stuttgart as a gift from 'Monk Ulrich'. In the 17th century the city was the third largest German wine-growing community in the Holy Roman Empire. Wine remained Stuttgart's leading source of income well into the 19th century.

Stuttgart is still one of Germany's largest wine-growing cities with more than 400 hectares of vine area, thanks in main to its location at the center of Germany's fourth largest wine region, the Württemberg wine growing area which covers 11,522 ha (28,470 acres) and is one of only 13 official areas captured under German wine law. The continuing importance of wine to the local economy is marked every year at the annual wine festival ('Weindorf').

Stuttgart also has several famous breweries such as Stuttgarter Hofbräu, Dinkelacker, and Schwaben Bräu.

== Education ==
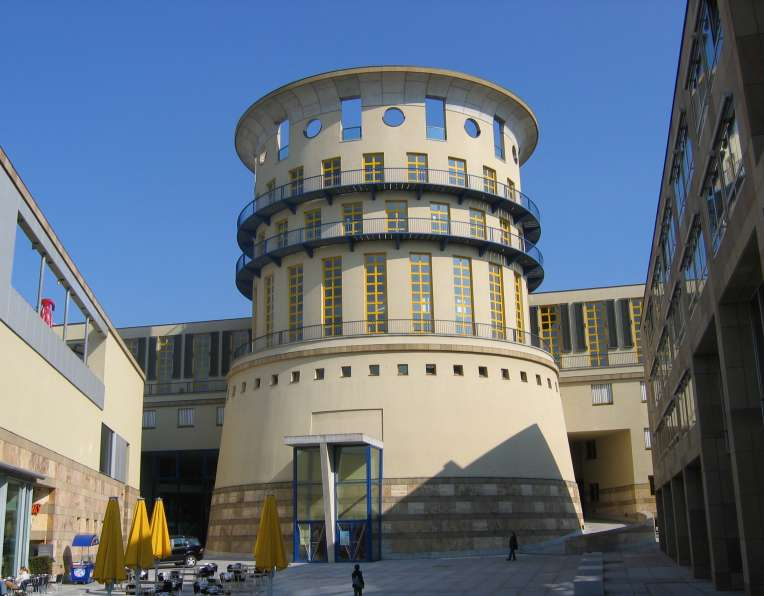
The new building of the State University of Music and Performing Arts, designed by James Stirling

Stuttgart and its region have been home to some significant figures of German thought and literature, the most important ones being Georg Wilhelm Friedrich Hegel, Friedrich Schiller and Friedrich Hölderlin.

The city, in its engineering tradition as the cradle of the automobile, has also always been a place of research and innovation. Stuttgart has Germany's second-highest number of institutions (six) of applied research of the Fraunhofer Society (after Dresden).

=== Tertiary education ===
The city is not considered a traditional university city, but nevertheless has a variety of institutions of higher education. The most significant of them are:

- University of Stuttgart, it is the fourth biggest university in Baden-Württemberg after Heidelberg, Tübingen and Freiburg. Founded in 1829, it was a Technische Hochschule ("Technical University") until 1967, when it was renamed to "university". Its campus for social sciences and architecture is located in the city centre, near the main train station, while the natural science campus is in the southwestern city district of Vaihingen. Historically, it has been especially renowned for its faculty of architecture (Stuttgarter Schule). Today, its main focus is on engineering and other technical subjects.
- University of Hohenheim, founded in 1818 as an academy for agricultural science and forestry. While these subjects are still taught there today, its other focus today is on business administration. It is located in Hohenheim quarter of the southern city district of Plieningen.
- State University of Music and Performing Arts Stuttgart, founded in 1857, located in the city center, next to the Neue Staatsgalerie
- State Academy of Fine Arts in Stuttgart, one of the biggest art colleges in Germany, founded in 1761, located in the Killesberg quarter of the northern city district Stuttgart-Nord
- Stuttgart Media University (Hochschule der Medien Stuttgart), founded in 2001 as a university of applied sciences, a merger of the former College of Printing and Publishing and the College of Librarianship, located in Vaihingen
- Stuttgart Technology University of Applied Sciences (Hochschule für Technik Stuttgart), founded in 1832 as a college for craftsmanship, university of applied sciences since 1971, located in the city center, near the University of Stuttgart's city-center campus
- University of Cooperative Education Baden-Württemberg, founded in 1974, with a focus on practical experience, subjects are business, technology and social work

Historically, an elite military academy existed in Stuttgart in the late 18th century (1770–1794), the Hohe Karlsschule, at Solitude Castle. Friedrich Schiller and the city's most famous Classicist architect, Nikolaus Friedrich von Thouret, were among its many esteemed alumni.

=== Primary and secondary education ===
The first Waldorf School (also known as Rudolf Steiner School) was founded here in 1919 by the director of the Waldorf Astoria tobacco factory, Emil Molt, and Austrian social thinker Rudolf Steiner, a comprehensive school following Steiner's educational principles of anthroposophy and humanistic ideals. Today, four of these schools are located in Stuttgart.

The Eberhard-Ludwigs-Gymnasium was created in 1668 from a historical Latin School as a model high school with the goal of modernising education. Later, the Dillman-Gymnasium, Friedrich-Eugens-Gymnasium and Karls-Gymnasium emerged from it.

=== International School ===
Since 1985 Stuttgart is home to the International School of Stuttgart, one of fewer than 100 schools worldwide that offer all three International Baccalaureate programs- the IB Primary Years (Early Learning to Grade 5), IB Middle Years (Grade 6 to 10), IB Diploma (grades 11–12). The International School of Stuttgart is accredited by both the Council of International Schools and the New England Association of Schools and Colleges.

== Media and publishing ==
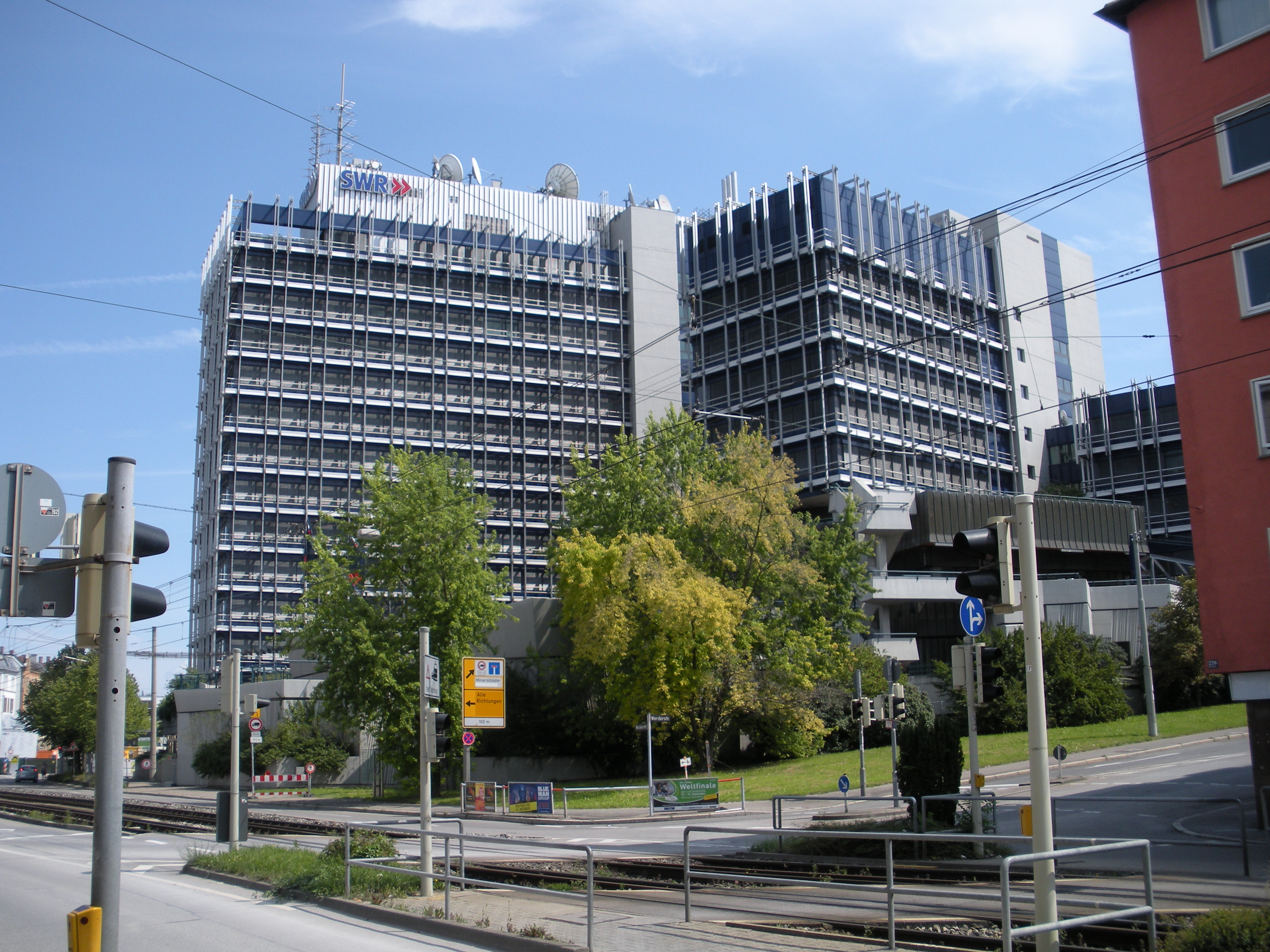
Headquarters of SWR

One of the headquarters of the public Südwestrundfunk (SWR; Southwest Broadcasting) channels (several radio and one TV channel; regional focus on the southwestern German States of Baden-Württemberg and Rhineland-Palatinate) is located in Stuttgart (the other ones being Baden-Baden and Mainz). It also has a Landesmedienzentrum, a state media center.

Furthermore, the city is a significant centre of publishing and specialist printing, with renowned houses such as Georg von Holtzbrinck Publishing Group, Ernst Klett Verlag (schoolbooks), Kohlhammer Verlag, Metzler Verlag and Motor Presse having their head offices there. The Reclam Verlag is located in nearby Ditzingen.

The newspapers Stuttgarter Zeitung (StZ; regional, with significant supra-regional, national and international sections) and Stuttgarter Nachrichten (StN; regional) are published here as well as a number of smaller, local papers such as Cannstatter Zeitung.

As is the case wherever the US military is stationed, there is an American Forces Network (AFN) station. It transmits on FM on 102.3 MHz from Fernmeldeturm Frauenkopf and on AM on 1143 kHz from Hirschlanden transmitter.

== Transport ==
Following the suit of other German cities such as Berlin, Cologne and Hanover, on 1 March 2008 a low emission zone (LEZ) came into effect in Stuttgart with the aim of improving air quality. This affects all vehicles entering the Stuttgart 'Environmental zone' (Umweltzone), including vehicles from abroad.

=== Local transport ===
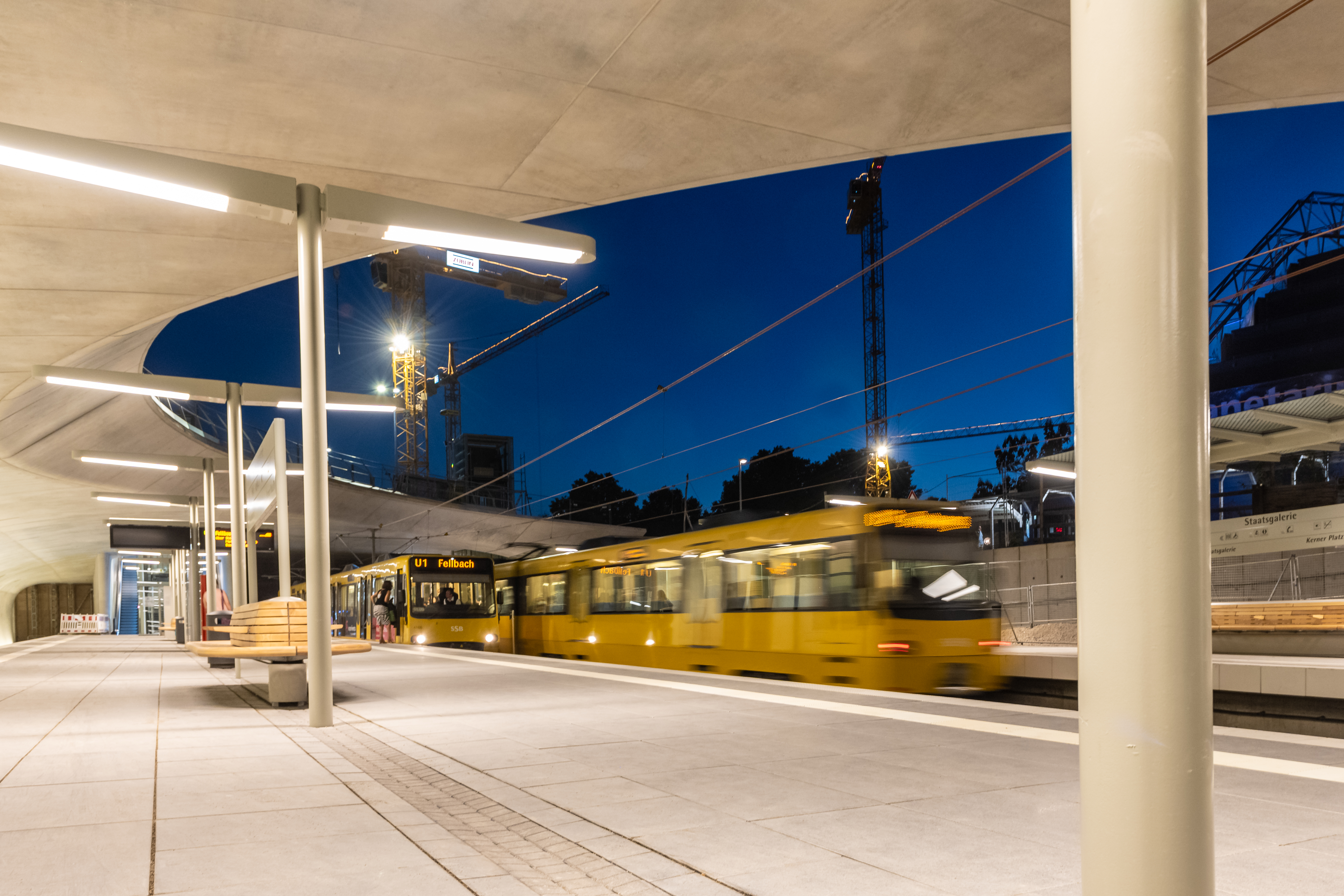
Stuttgart Stadtbahn

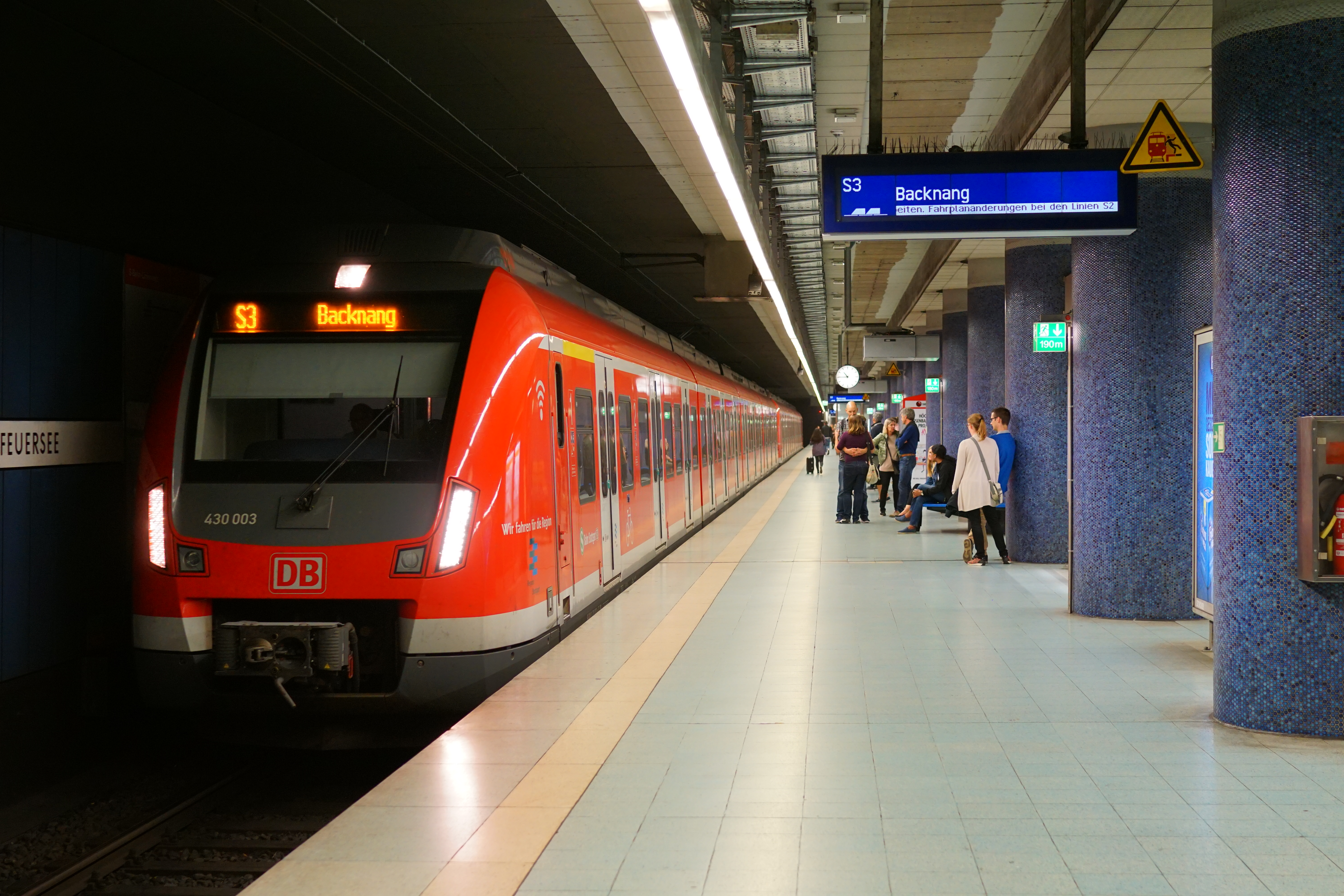
Stuttgart S-Bahn

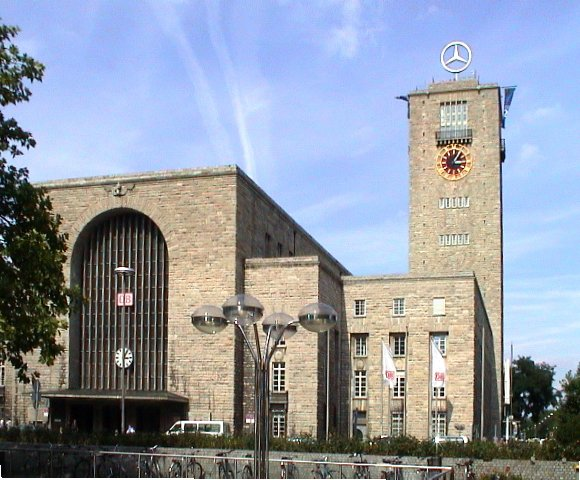
Stuttgart Hauptbahnhof (main railway station)

Flixtrain in Stuttgart Hbf

Stuttgart has a light rail system known as the Stuttgart Stadtbahn. In the city center and densely built-up areas, the Stadtbahn runs underground. Stations are signposted with a 'U' symbol, which stands for unabhängig (independent), due to the system being mostly separated from road traffic. Until 2007, Stuttgart also operated regular trams. Stuttgart also has a large bus network. Stadtbahn lines and buses are operated by the Stuttgarter Straßenbahnen AG (SSB). The outlying suburbs of Stuttgart and nearby towns are served by a suburban railway system called the Stuttgart S-Bahn, using tracks supplied by the national Deutsche Bahn AG (DB).

A peculiarity of Stuttgart is the Zahnradbahn, a rack railway that is powered by electricity and operates between Marienplatz in the southern inner-city district of the city and the district of Degerloch. It is the only urban rack railway in Germany. Stuttgart also has a Standseilbahn, a funicular railway that operates in the Heslach area and the forest cemetery (Waldfriedhof). In Killesberg Park, on a prominent hill overlooking the city, there is the miniature railway run by diesel (and on weekends with steam).

=== Rail links ===
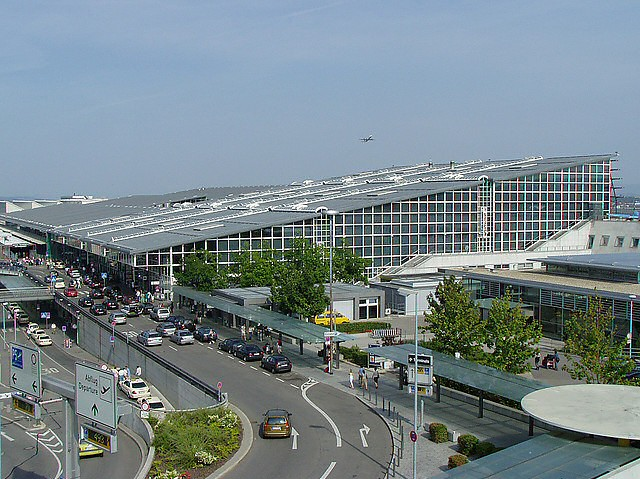
Stuttgart Airport

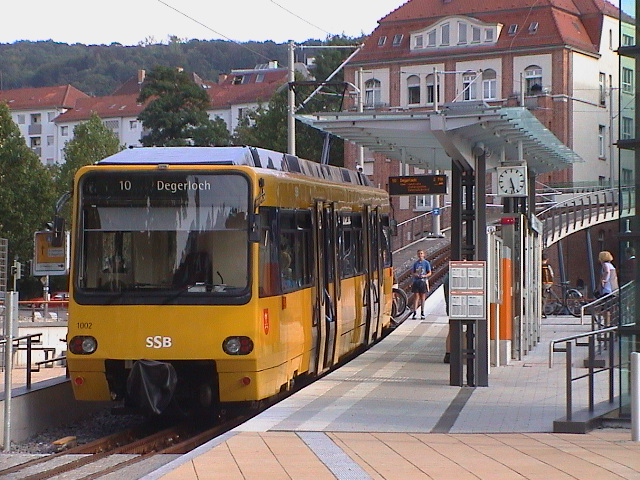
Rack railway

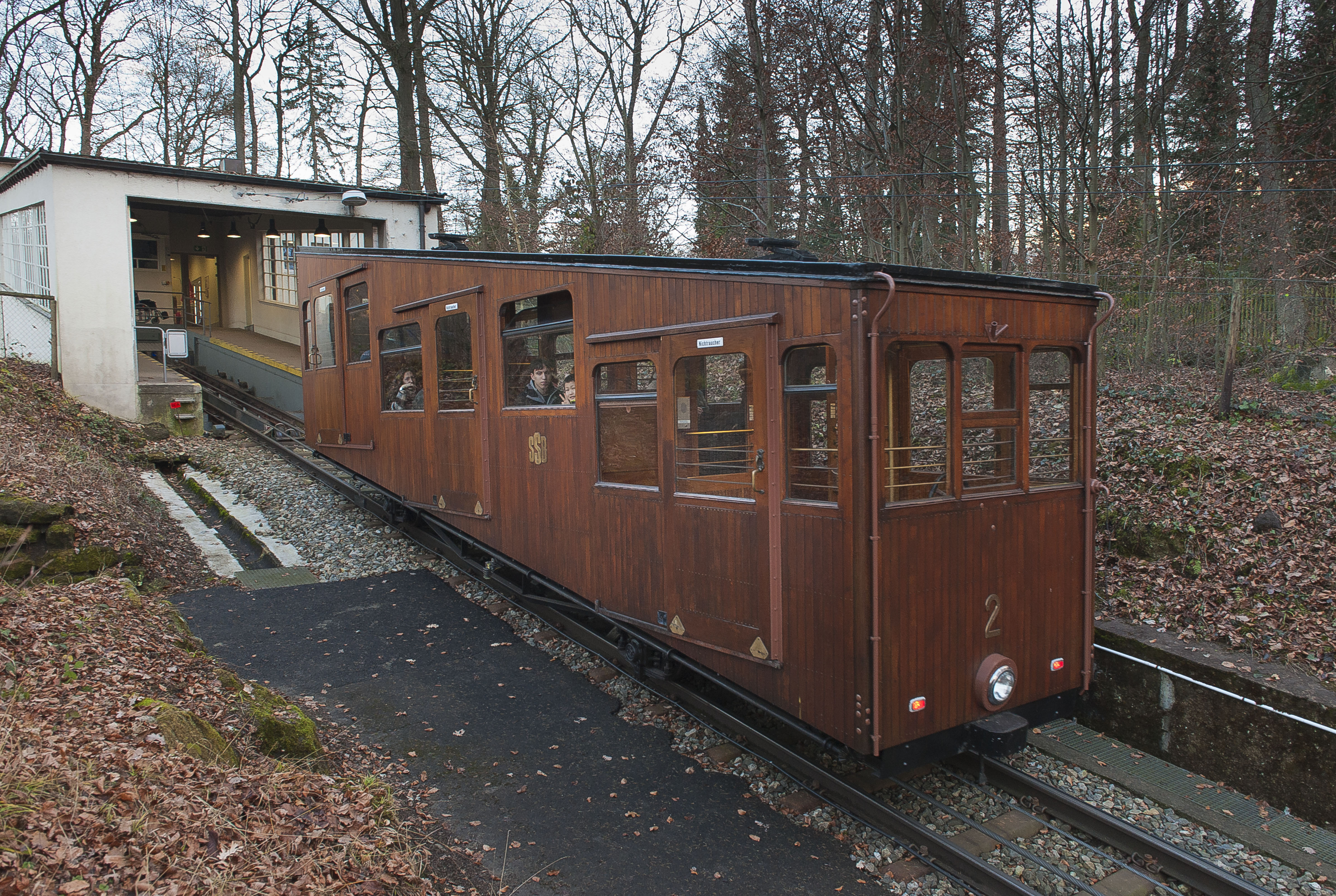
Funicular

Stuttgart is a hub in the Intercity-Express and Intercity networks of Deutsche Bahn AG (DB), with through services to most other major German cities. It also operates international services to Strasbourg, Vienna, Zürich and Paris (five times a day, journey time 3 hours 11 minutes).

Long-distance trains stop at Stuttgart Hauptbahnhof, the city's main line terminus, which is also used by Interregio-Express, Regional-Express and Regionalbahn trains for services to stations in the Stuttgart metropolitan area. The local rail networks (see above) operate underneath the terminus.

Stuttgart also has its own rail freight centre with marshalling yards and a container terminal in the Obertürkheim area of Hedelfingen.

=== Rail: The Stuttgart 21 project ===
After years of political debate and controversy, plans were approved in October 2007 to convert the existing above-ground main train station to an underground through station. The Stuttgart 21 project will include the rebuilding of surface and underground lines connecting the station in Stuttgart's enclosed central valley with existing railway and underground lines. Building work started in 2010 with controversial modifications to the Hauptbahnhof and was slated to be completed in 2019, but ongoing delays mean completion will be no sooner than 2027.

=== Air transport ===
Stuttgart is served by Stuttgart Airport (German: Flughafen Stuttgart, IATA airport code STR), an international airport approximately 13 km (8 mi) south of the city centre on land belonging mainly to neighboring towns. It takes 30 minutes to reach the airport from the city center using S-Bahn lines S2 or S3 or Stadtbahn line U6. Stuttgart airport is Germany's only international airport with one runway. Despite protests and local initiatives, surveys are currently underway to assess the impact of a second runway.

=== Road transport ===
Stuttgart is served by Autobahn A8, that runs east–west from Karlsruhe to Munich, and Autobahn A81 that runs north–south from Würzburg to Singen. The Autobahn A831 is a short spur entering the southern side of Stuttgart.

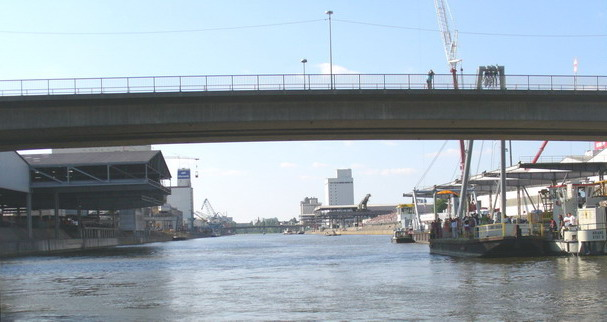
Port on Neckar River in Stuttgart

Besides these Autobahns, Stuttgart is served by a large number of expressways, many of which are built to Autobahn standards, and were once intended to carry an A-number. Important expressways like B10, B14, B27 and B29 connect Stuttgart with its suburbs. Due to the hilly surroundings, there are many road tunnels in and around Stuttgart. There are also a number of road tunnels under intersections in the center of Stuttgart.

=== Waterways ===
Stuttgart has an inland port in Hedelfingen on the Neckar.

== Sport ==
=== Football ===
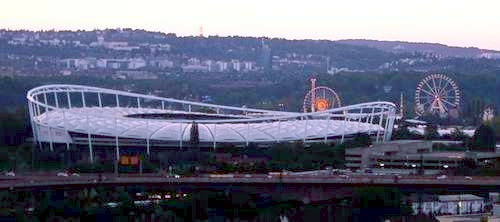
VfB Stuttgart's home ground, the MHPArena in Bad Cannstatt. In the background: the Stuttgart Spring Festival.

As in many parts of Germany, football is the most popular sport in Stuttgart which is home to 'The Reds' and 'The Blues'. 'The Reds', VfB Stuttgart, are the most famous and popular local club. An established team currently playing in the German Bundesliga, VfB was founded in 1893 and has won five German titles since 1950, most recently in 1992 and 2007. VfB is based at the MHPArena in Bad Cannstatt.

'The Blues', Stuttgarter Kickers, are the second most important football team; their most successful years date back to the time when young Jürgen Klinsmann started his career as forward in their team. They currently play in the Regionalliga Südwest (fourth division) at the smaller Gazi Stadium close to the TV tower in Degerloch.

Other lower-division football teams are Sportfreunde Stuttgart – most famous for taking part in the Sir Thomas Lipton Trophy in 1908, considered the first World Cup – and FV Zuffenhausen.

=== Other sports ===
TV Bittenfeld has been playing in the men's Handball-Bundesliga since the 2015–2016 season under the name TVB 1898 Stuttgart. The home venue is the Scharrena Stuttgart, part of the home games also take place in the Porsche-Arena for capacity reasons. VfL Pfullingen/Stuttgart played in the Bundesliga from 2001 to 2006, where they played their home games in the Hanns-Martin-Schleyer-Halle.

Since 2008, the women's volleyball team Allianz MTV Stuttgart (until 2010 Allianz Volley Stuttgart, until 2012 Smart Allianz Stuttgart) plays in the Deutsche Volleyball-Bundesliga. They became German champions in 2019 and 2022, having previously been runners-up four times in a row from 2015 to 2018, and also won the German cup four times and reached the final of CEV Cup. CJD Feuerbach was German champion in women's volleyball three times. The club withdrew its first team from the Bundesliga in 1996 for financial reasons.

Stuttgart has two major ice hockey teams. Stuttgart Rebels EC, plays in the "Landesliga" (4th tier) at the Waldau ice rink in Degerloch. The Bietigheim Bissingen Steelers play in the first division of the DEL. The Steelers play in the new Ege Trans Arena in Bietigheim.

The strongest local water polo team is SV Cannstatt, which won the German championship in 2006.

Stuttgart has three American Football teams: the Stuttgart Silver Arrows, who play in the Regionalliga Südwest, and the Stuttgart Scorpions as part of the German Football League, who play in Stuttgarter Kickers' Gazi Stadium. With Stuttgart Surge a third team was founded in 2021 as part of the European League of Football (ELF) and is likewise supposed to play in the Gazi Stadium.

Australian Football is practiced by the Stuttgart Emus – one of only six active teams in Germany. It participates in the Australian Football League Germany when they play their home games in the Eberhard-Bauer-Stadion.

TC Weissenhof is a Stuttgart-based women's tennis team that has won the German championship four times. Another women's team is TEC Waldau Stuttgart (German champions in 2006).

HTC Stuttgarter Kickers is one of the most successful field hockey clubs in Germany, having won the German championship in 2005 and a European title in 2006.

Stuttgart has also hosted the Stihl Timbersports Series in world logging championships.

=== Sporting events ===
Stuttgart has a reputation for staging major events, including the FIFA World Cup 1974, the finals stages of the FIBA EuroBasket 1985, the UEFA Euro 1988, and the World Championships in Athletics 1993. It was also one of the twelve host cities of the FIFA World Cup 2006. Six matches, three of them second round matches, including the third and fourth place playoff, were played at the Gottlieb Daimler Stadium (today MHPArena). Stuttgart was also 2007 European Capital of Sport, hosting events such as the UCI World Cycling Championships Road Race and the IAAF World Athletics Final.

Other famous sports venues are the Weissenhof tennis courts, where the annual Mercedes Cup tennis tournament is played, the Porsche Arena (hosting tennis, basketball and handball), the Schleyerhalle (boxing, equestrianism/show jumping, gymnastics, track cycling etc.), and Scharrena Stuttgart.

== International relations ==
=== Twin towns – sister cities ===
Stuttgart is twinned with:

- (England) St Helens, United Kingdom (1948)
- (Wales) Cardiff, United Kingdom (1955)
- St. Louis, United States (1960)
- Strasbourg, France (1962)
- Mumbai, India (1968)
- Menzel Bourguiba, Tunisia (1971)
- Cairo, Egypt (1979)
- Łódź, Poland (1988)
- Brno, Czech Republic (1989)
- Samara, Russia (1992)
- Khmelnytskyi, Ukraine (2023)

The city district of Bad Cannstatt is twinned with:

- Újbuda (Budapest), Hungary

The city district of Vaihingen is twinned with:

- Melun, France

The city district of Zuffenhausen is twinned with:

- La Ferté-sous-Jouarre, France

=== Friendships ===
Stuttgart has friendly relations with:

- Ōgaki, Japan
- Nanjing, China
- Shavei Tzion, Israel

== In popular culture ==
=== Gaming ===
- In the 2003 video game Command & Conquer: Generals Zero Hour, GLA forces attacked the US base in Stuttgart in their final mission. In the first Chinese mission, the player must reclaim the city from the GLA.
- Herbert Ludwig, more commonly known as the Medic in Valve's 2007 first-person shooter game Team Fortress 2 is a native of Stuttgart.
- Reinhardt, one of the tank classes in Blizzard's 2016 team based shooter Overwatch, originates from Stuttgart. Furthermore, the game also features the map Eichenwalde, which is a fictional castle town near the city.

=== Novels ===
- In the 2005 novel The Book Thief, protagonist Max Vandenburg resides in Stuttgart until his flight later in the book.
- The action of the 1971 novella Reunion by Fred Uhlman, takes place in Stuttgart, following the tragic friendship of Hans Schwarz and Konradin von Hohenfels.

=== TV and cinema ===
- In the 2012 film The Avengers, the villain Loki is tracked to a gala in Stuttgart, where he intends to steal a large quantity of iridium for his schemes. These scenes were actually filmed in Cleveland, Ohio, and a number of Stuttgart residents noted the errors in the film's depiction of the city.

== Gallery ==
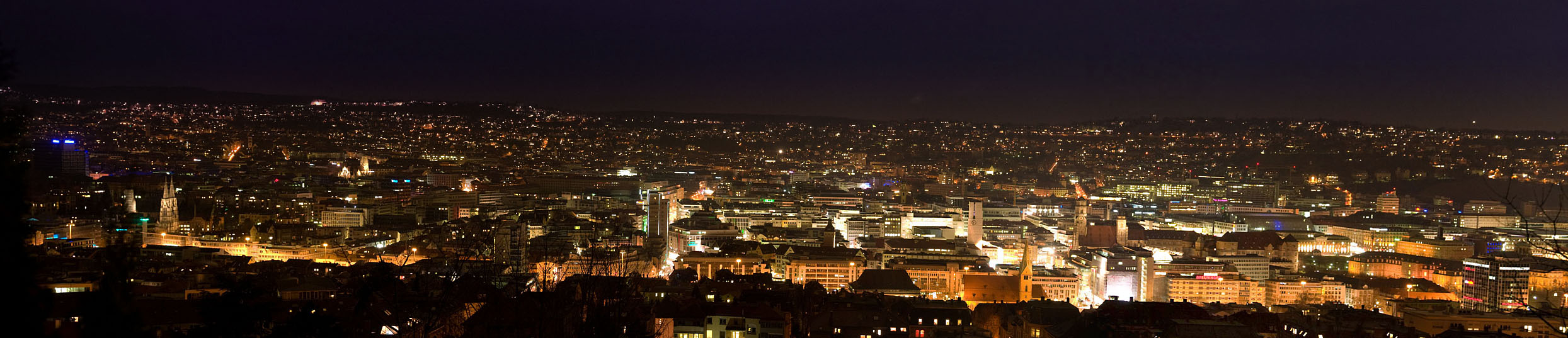
Stuttgart at night, looking northwest
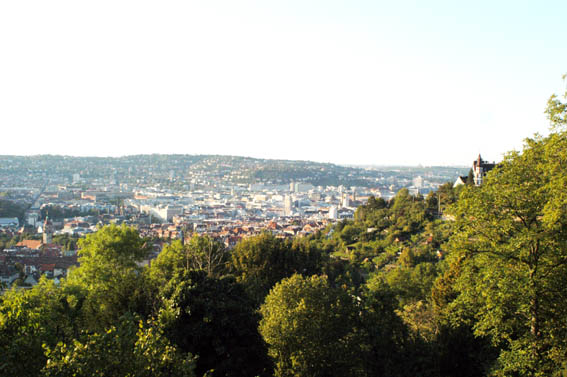
Stuttgart from Weinsteige Road

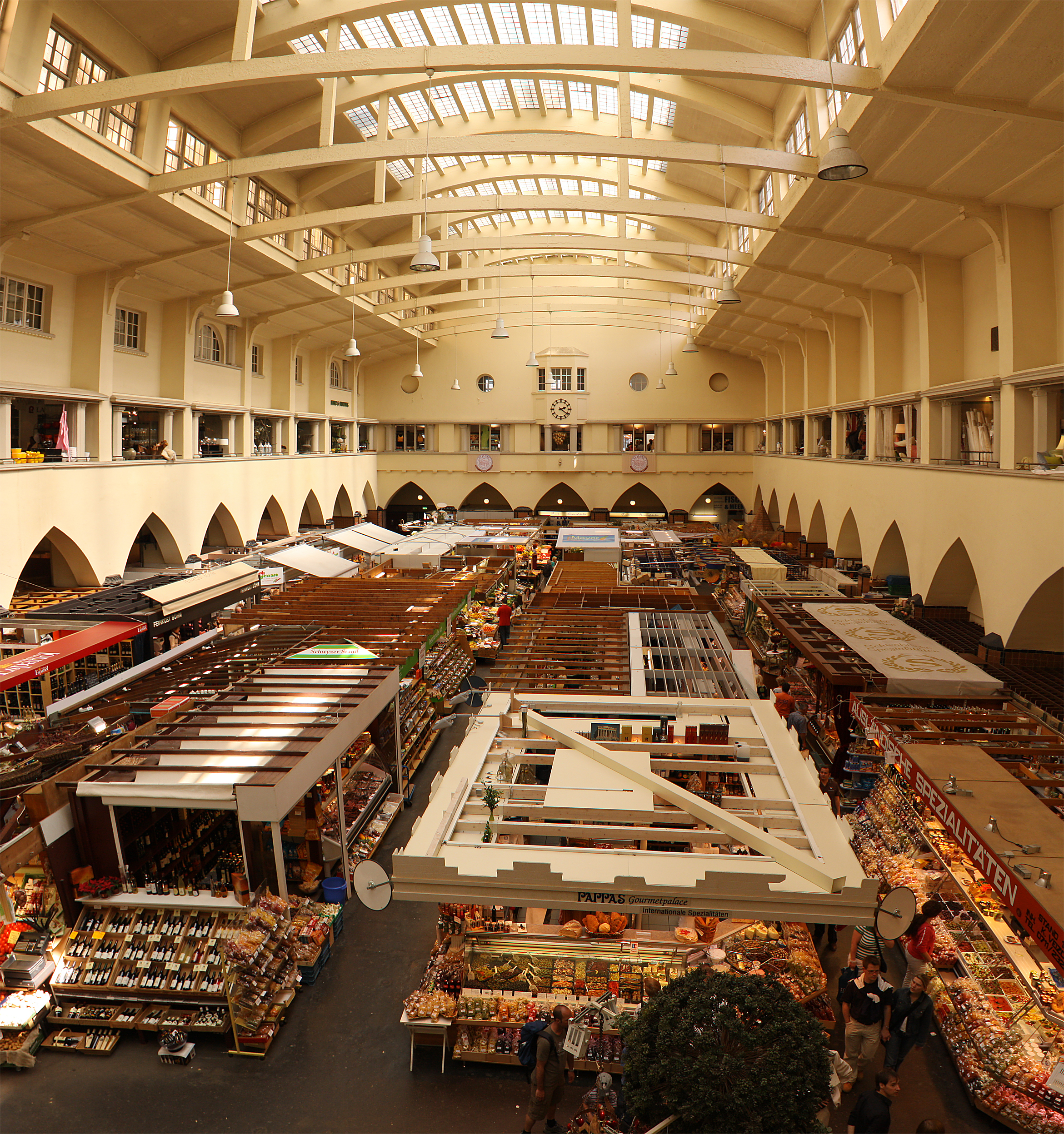
The Markthalle Stuttgart (Stuttgart Market Hall)

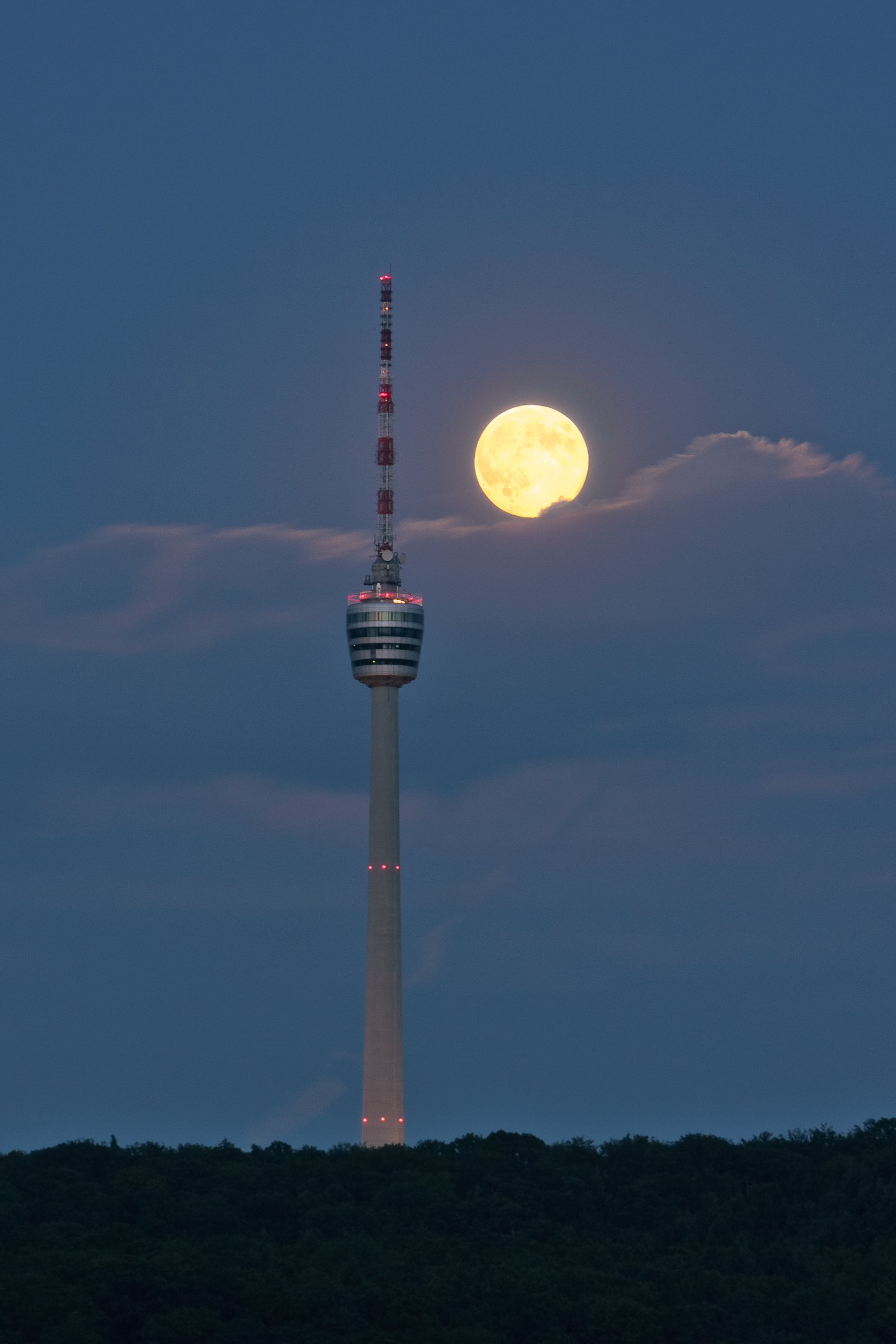
The 216 m (709 ft) Fernsehturm Stuttgart (Stuttgart Television Tower) at night

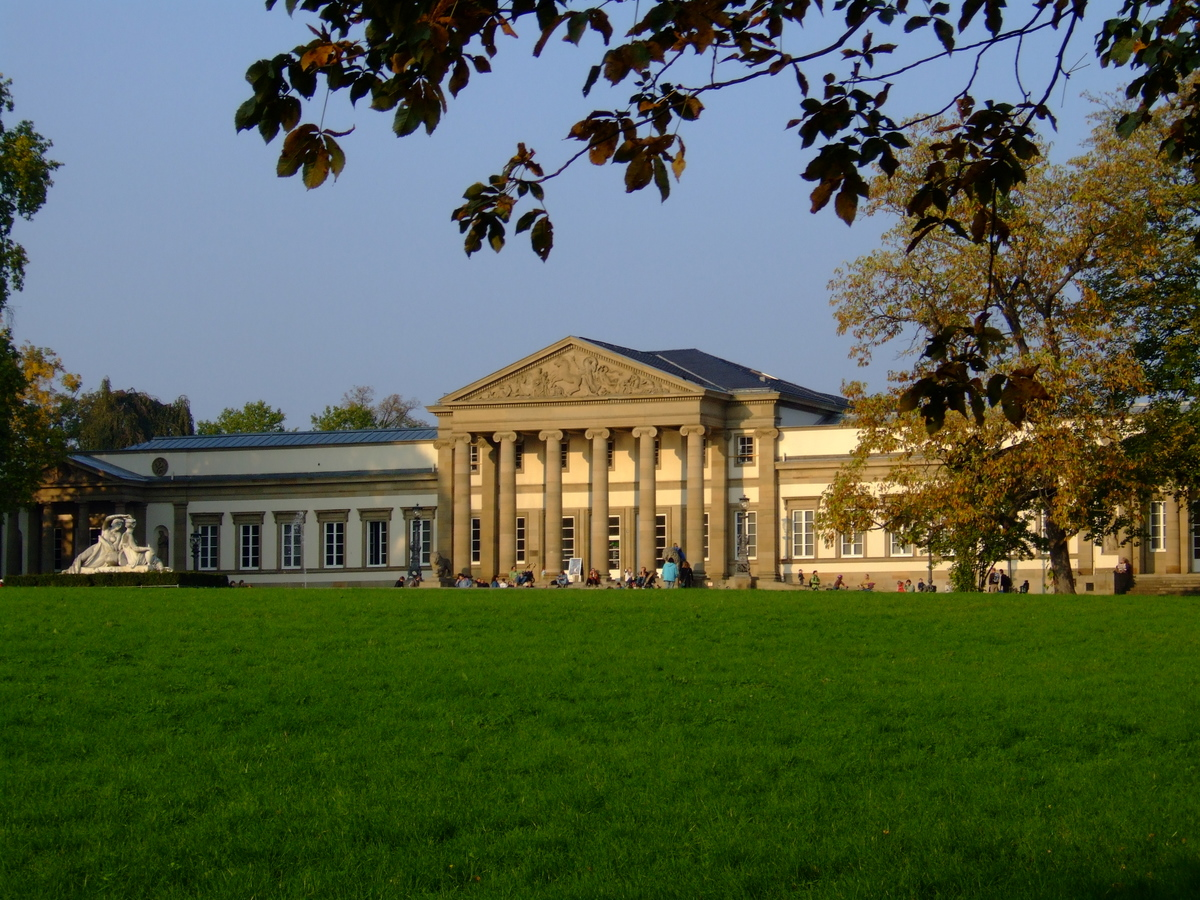
Castle Rosenstein

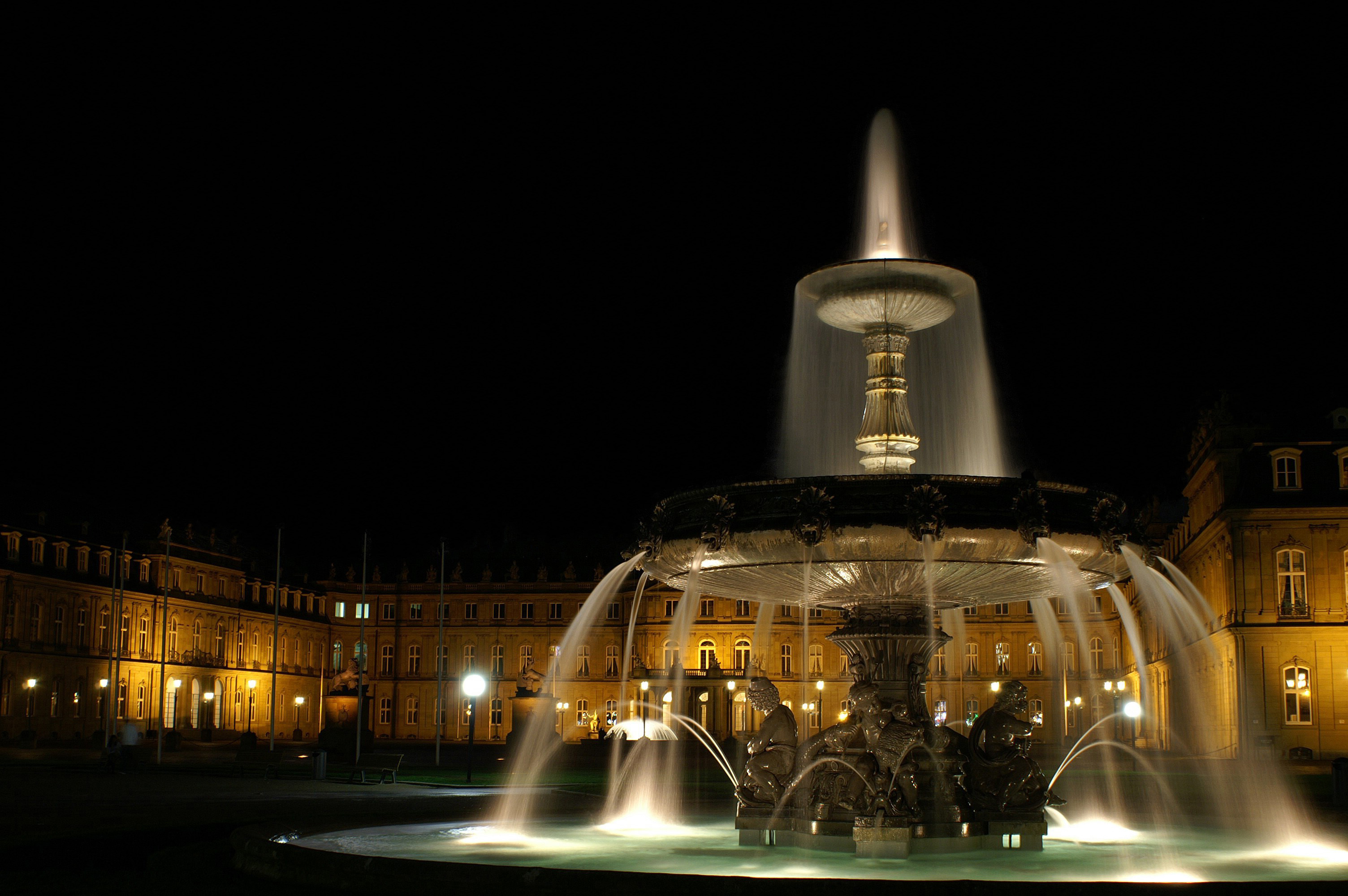
Neues Schloss at night

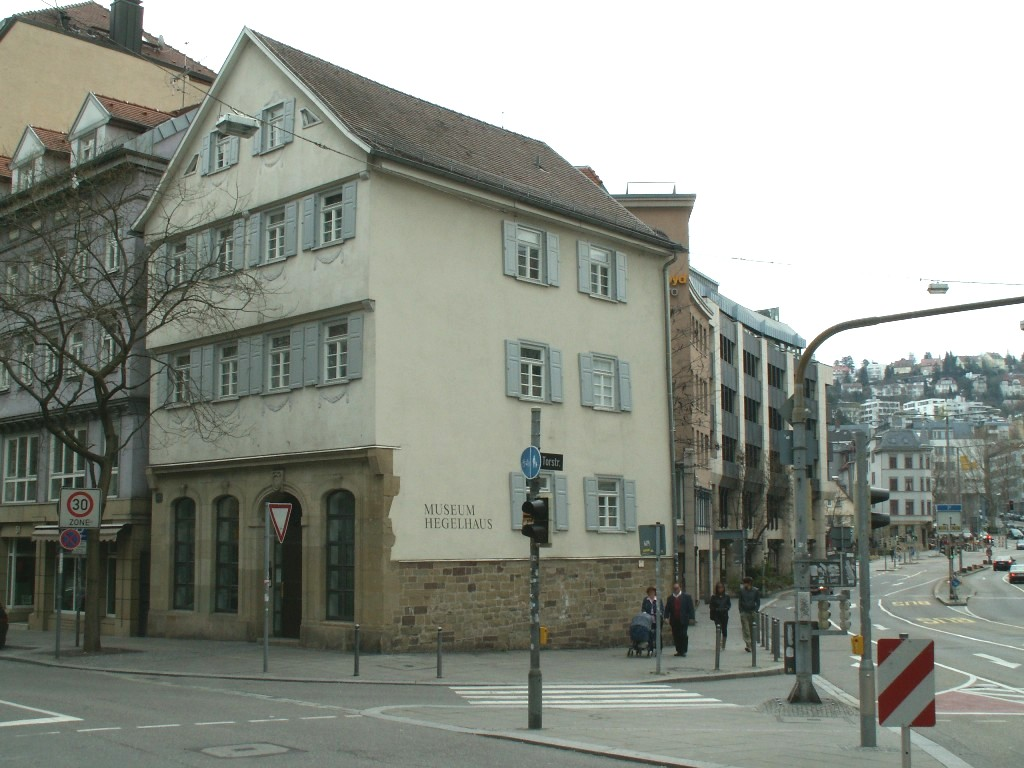
The Hegel Museum, birthplace of Hegel

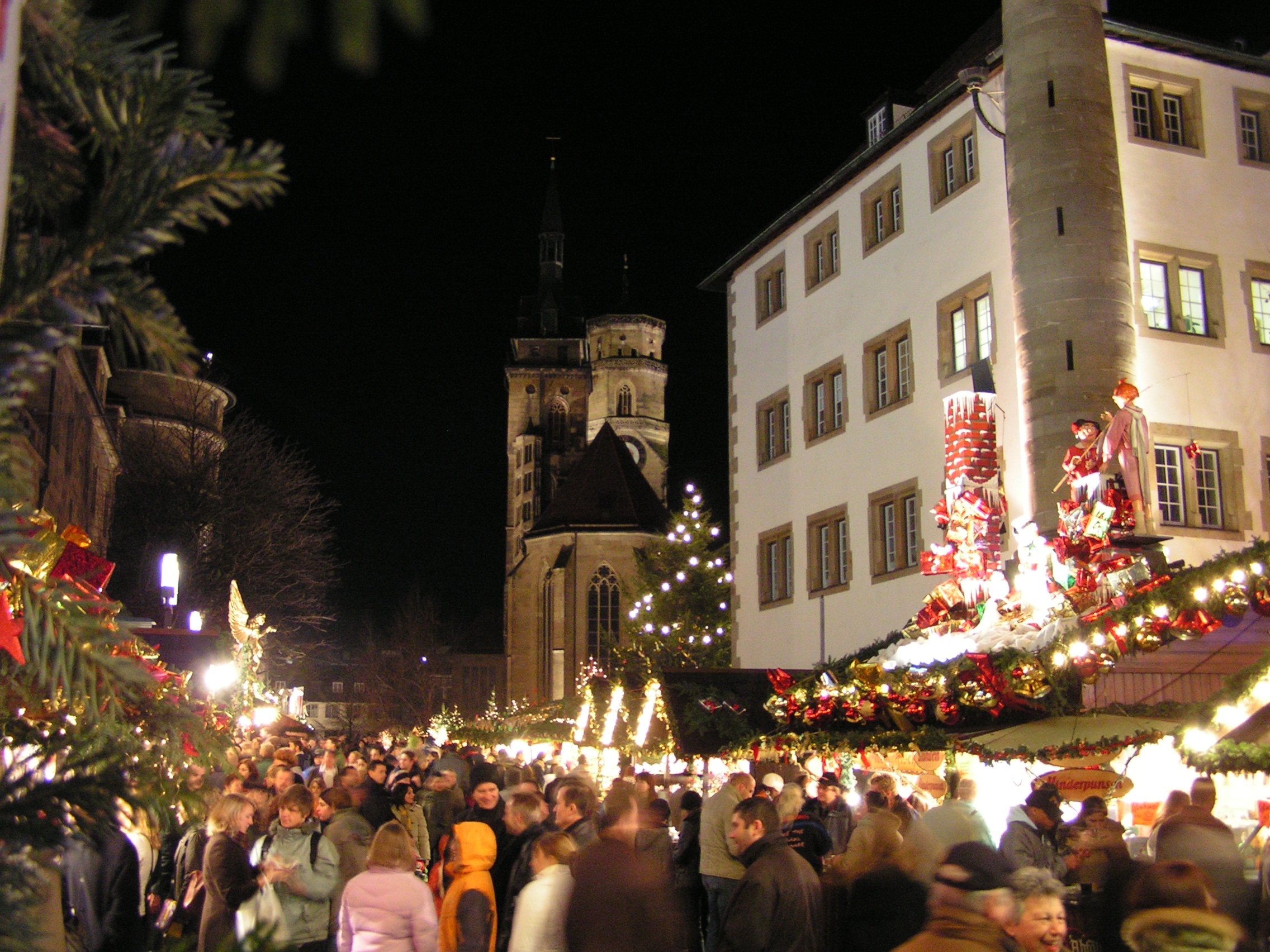
Stuttgart's annual Christmas market

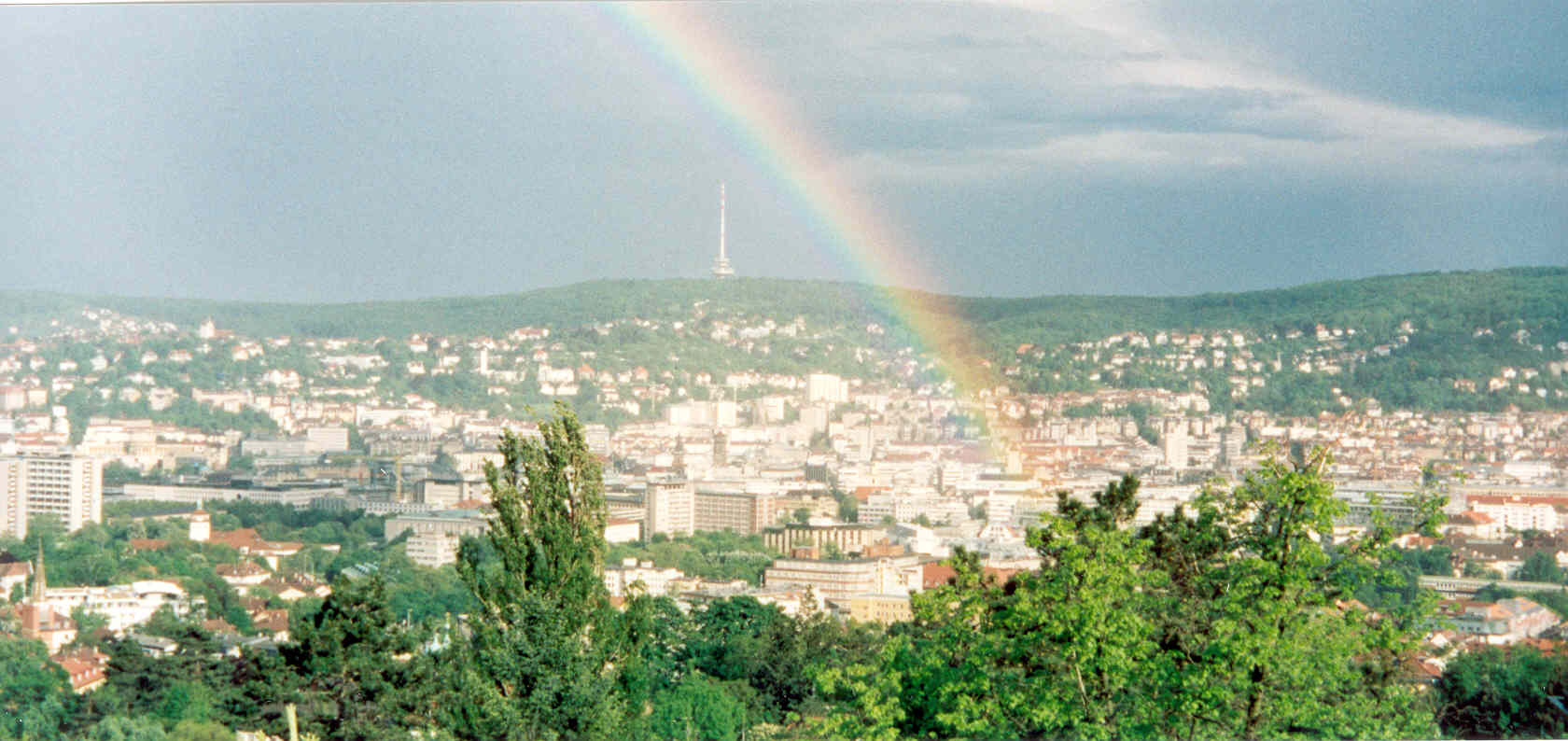
Romantic view of the downtown area seen from upper Lenzhalde

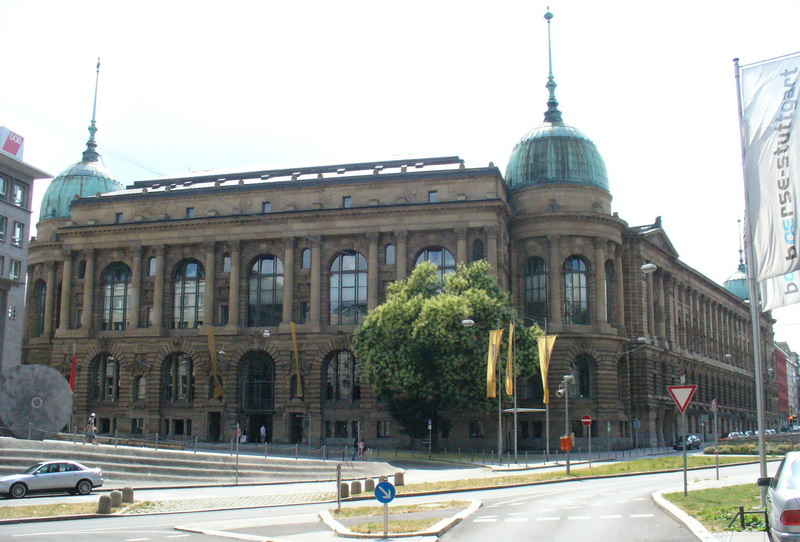
The Haus der Wirtschaft (House of Commerce)

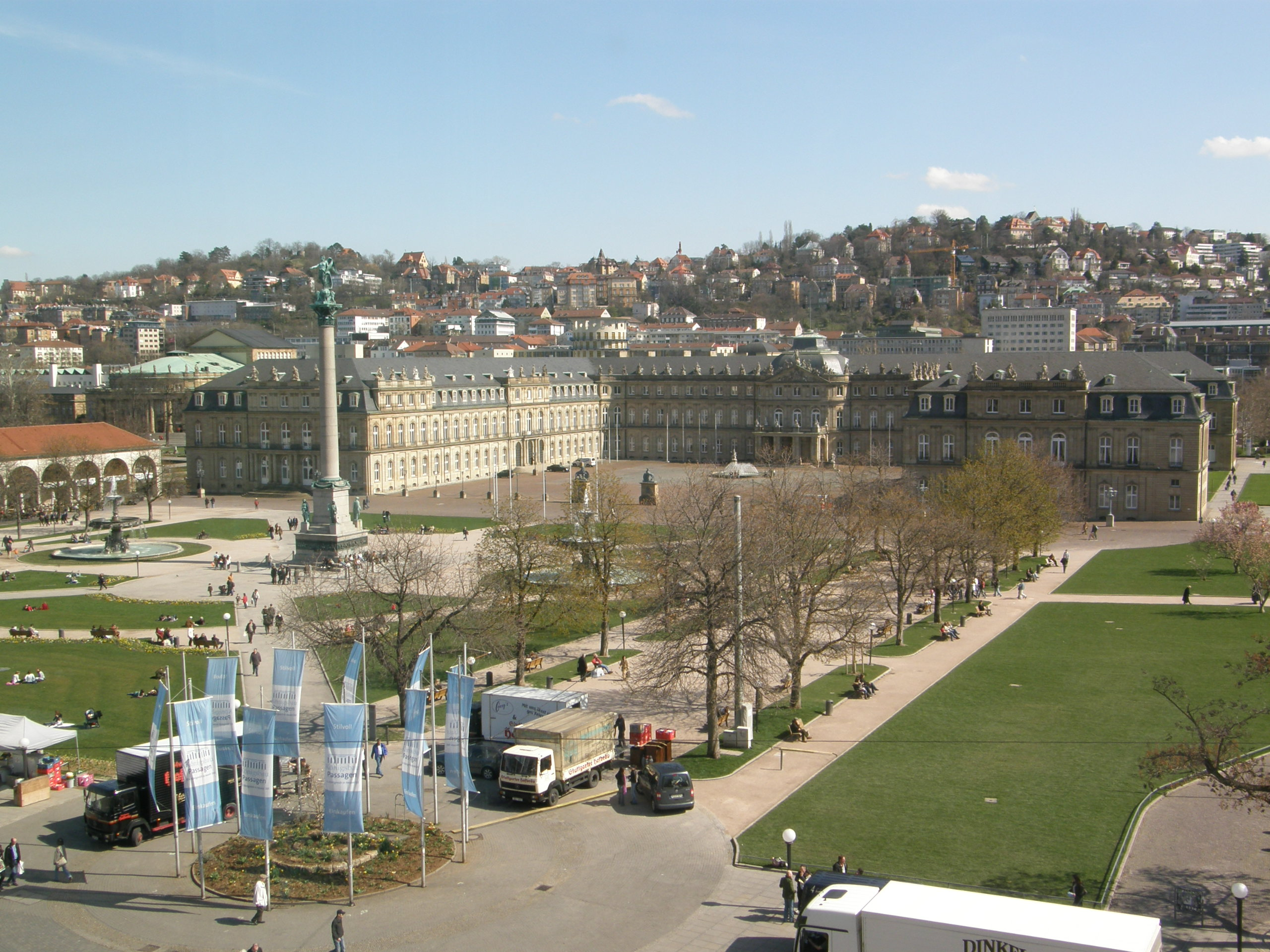
Schlossplatz

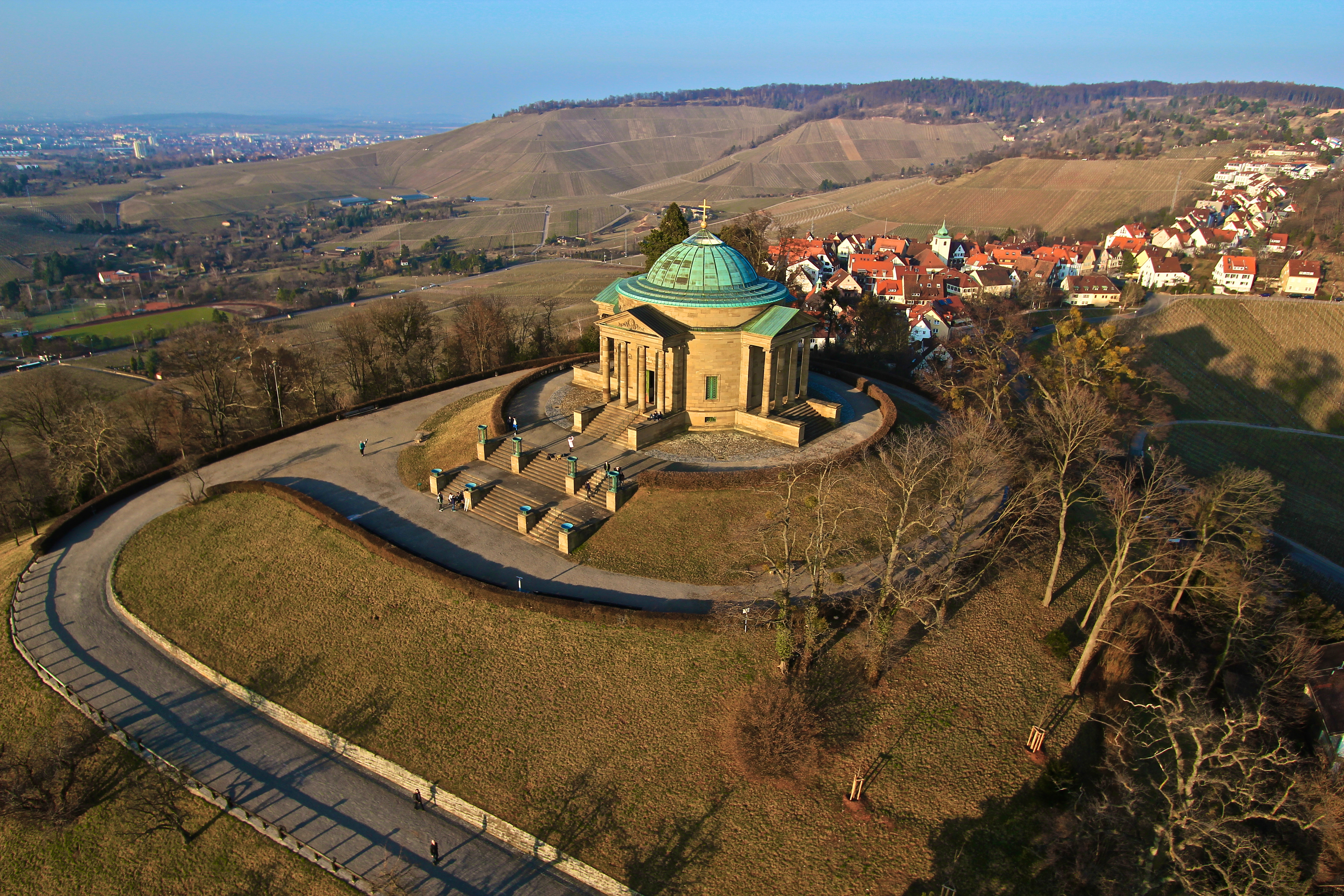
The grave chapel atop the Württemberg

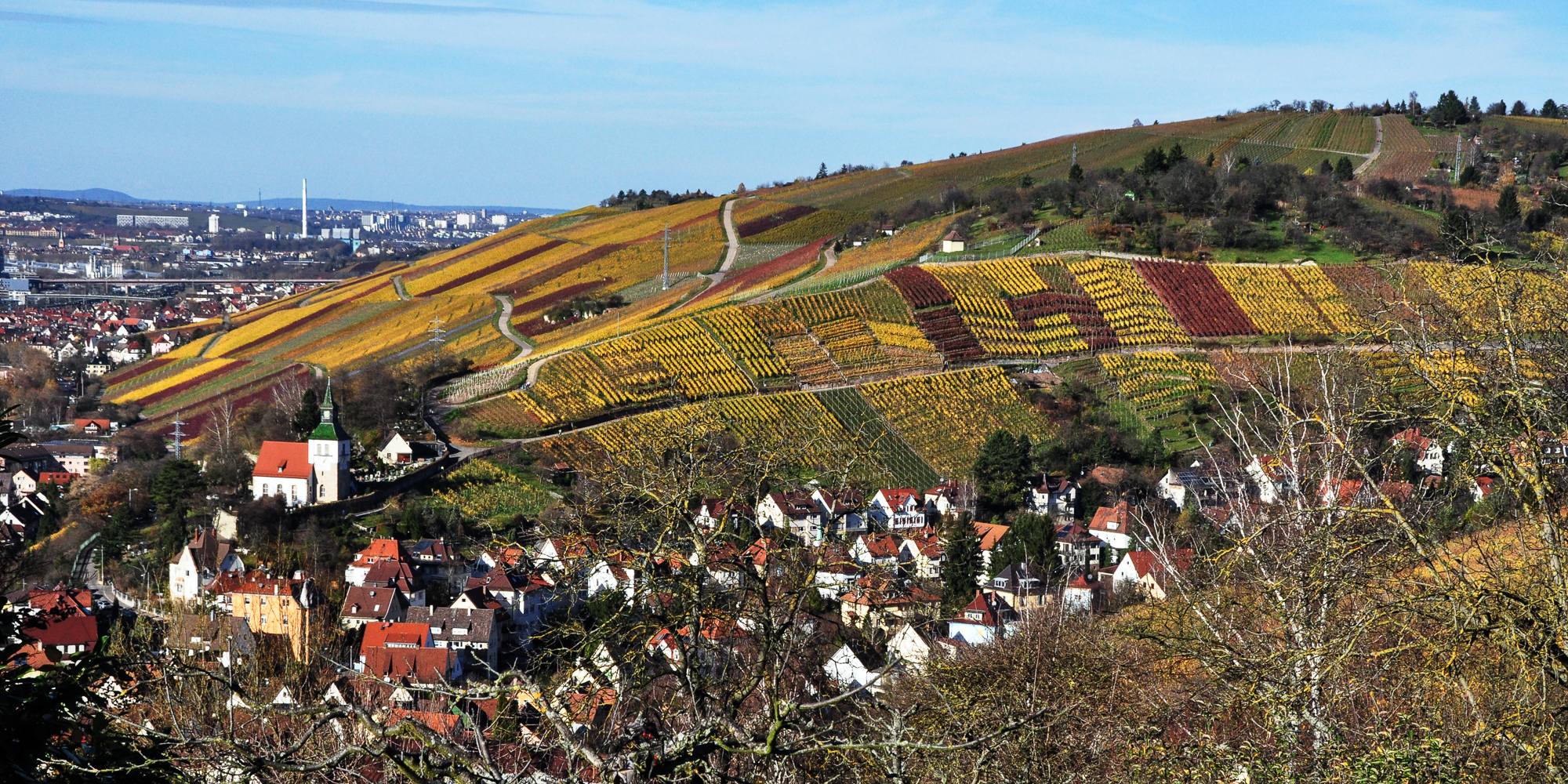
The mild climate and hilly landscape are perfect for viticulture, as the Romans discovered. Pictured are vineyards near Obertürkheim.

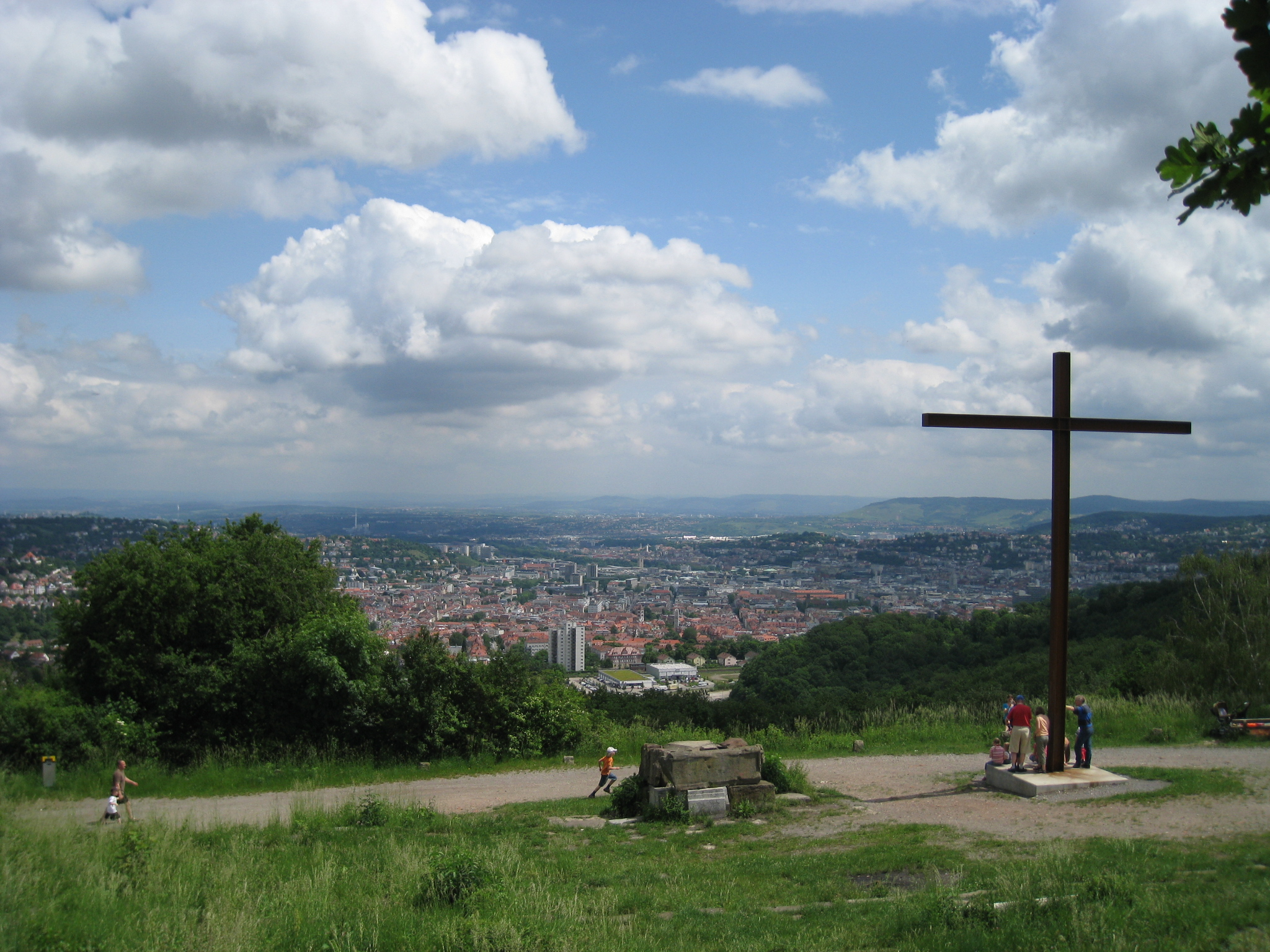
View of Stuttgart from atop the Birkenkopf

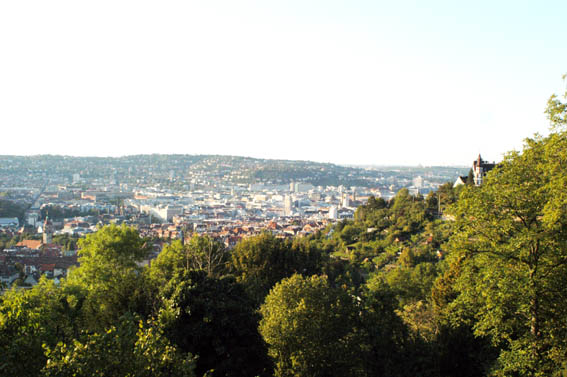
View from the Killesbergpark

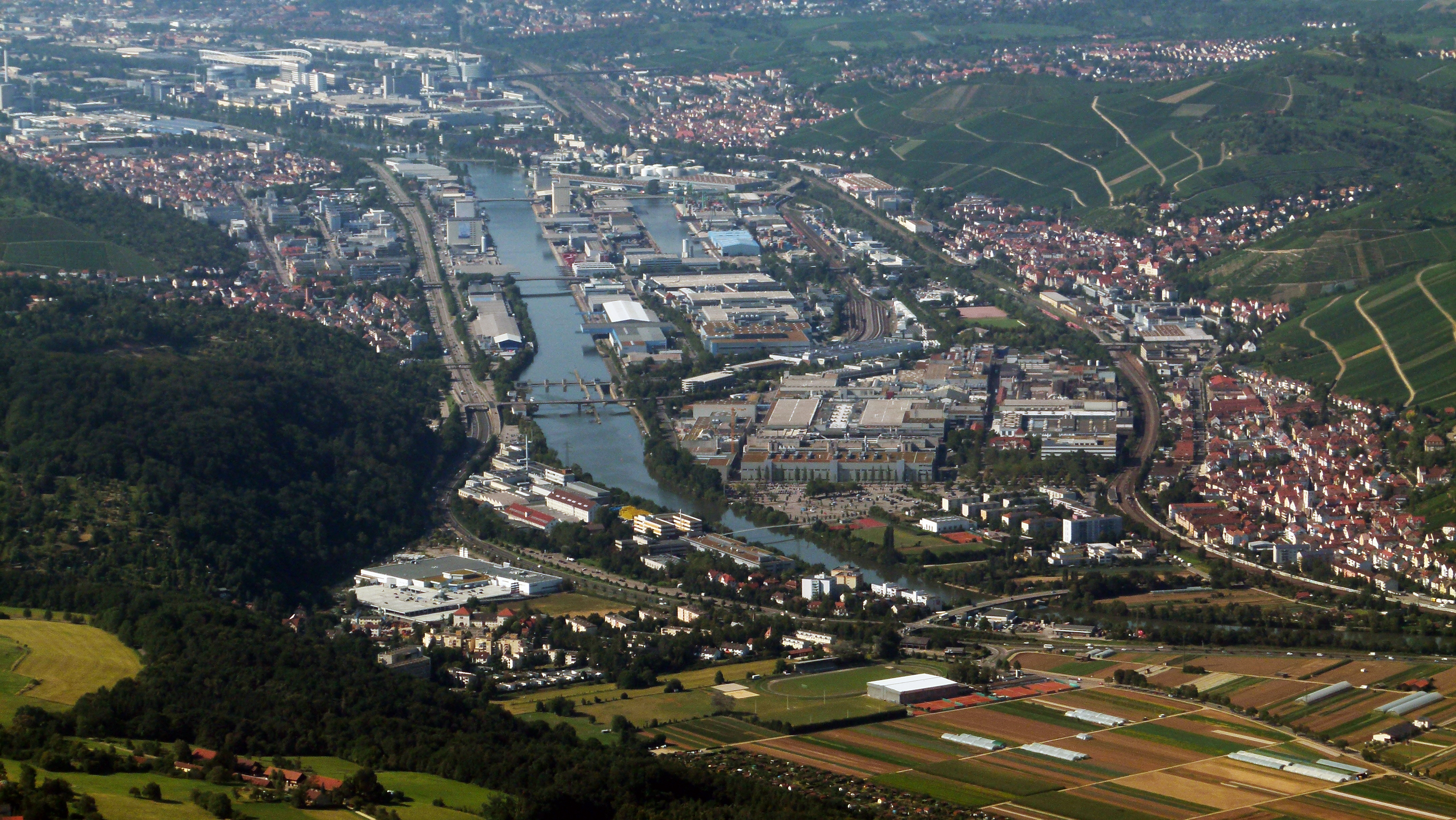
Neckar river flowing through Hedelfingen and Obertürkheim

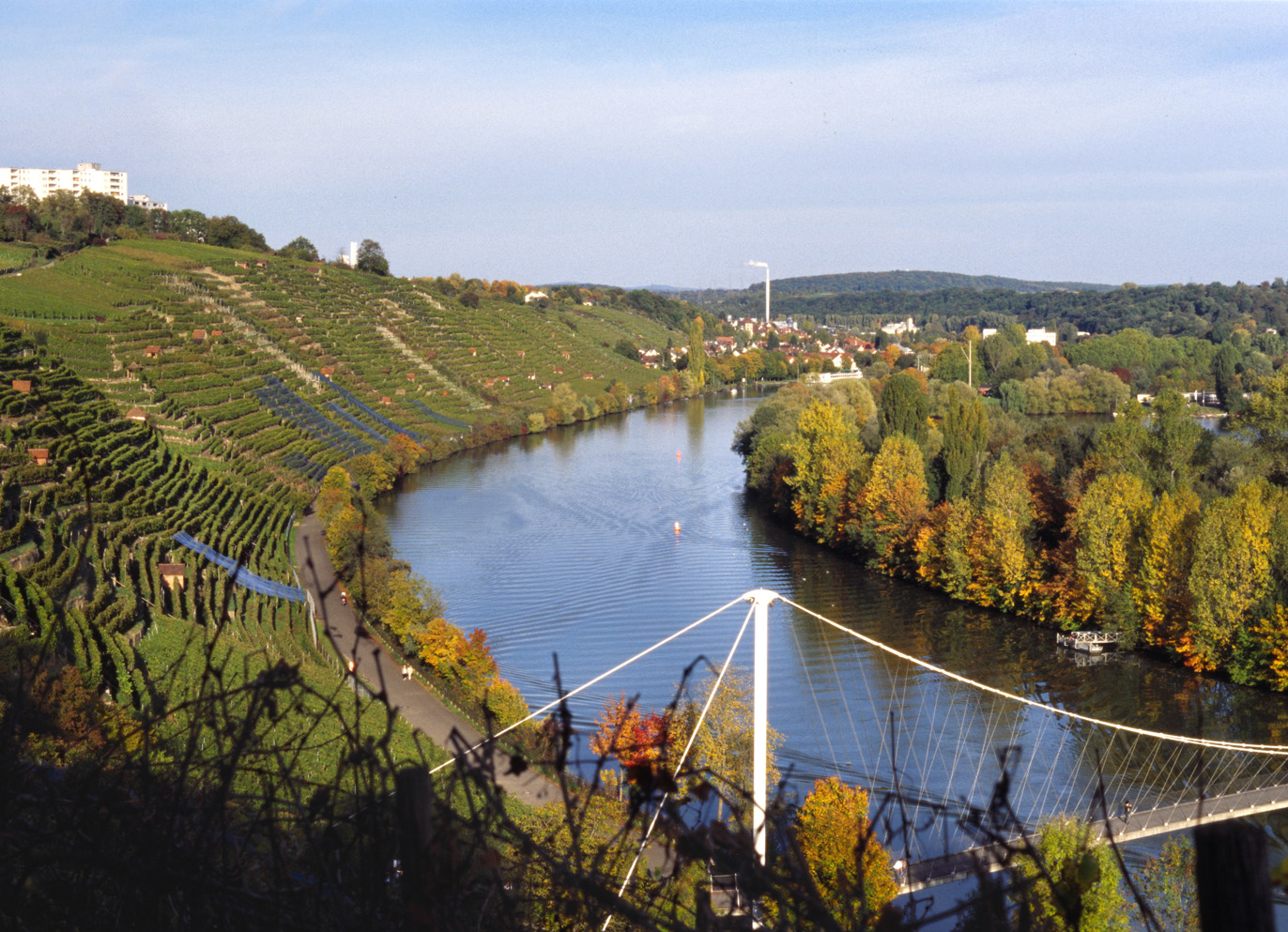
Vineyards on the Neckar river in the Mühlhausen area of Stuttgart during the Autumn of 2006

== Sources ==
- Bauz, Ingrid; Breuggemann, Roland (2013). Die Geheime Staatspolizei in Württemberg und Hohenzollern. Stuttgart, BW: Schmetterling-Verlag. ISBN 978-3-89657-138-0.
- Baynes, T. S.; Smith, W. R., eds. (1887), "Stuttgart" , Encyclopædia Britannica, vol. 22 (9th ed.), New York: Charles Scribner's Sons
- Bekker, Henk (2005). Adventure Guide Germany. Hunter Publishing. ISBN 978-1-58843-503-3. Archived from the original on 1 January 2016.
- Bietenholz, Peter G.; Deutscher, Thomas Brian (2003). Contemporaries of Erasumus: A Biographical Register of the Renaissance and Reformation. Vol. 1–3, A–Z. Toronto, Ontario, Canada: University of Toronto Press. ISBN 978-0-8020-8577-1. Archived from the original on 27 April 2016.
- Chisholm, Hugh, ed. (1911), "Stuttgart" , Encyclopædia Britannica, vol. 25 (11th ed.), Cambridge University Press
- Dieterle, Elizabeth; Muller, Werner; Schorr, Dieter; Schbert, Dieter; Schukra, Harald (1983). Stuttgart Portrat Einer Stadt. Munich, BV: Kunstverlag Josef Bühn. ASIN B00232CMRW.
- Dorling Kindersley (6 August 2001). Eyewitness Travel Guide to Germany. New York City, NY: Dorling Kindersley Publishing. ISBN 0-7894-6646-5.
- Dunkel, Franziska (2014). uftalarm. In: Fastnacht der Hölle. Der Erste Weltkrieg und die Sinne. Stuttgart, BW: Haus der Geschichte Baden-Württemberg.
- Gedenkstätten für die Opfer des Nationalsozialismus. Eine Dokumentation. Vol. 1. Bonn, North Rhine-Westphalia: Federal Agency for Civic Education. 1995. ISBN 3-89331-208-0.
- Fuchs, Karlheinz (October 2004). Baukunst im deutschen Sudwesten. Leinfelden-Echterdingen, BW: DRW-Verlag. ISBN 3-87181-491-1.
- Gühring, Albrecht; Matthias, Beer; Binder, Petra; Ehmer, Hermann; Friederich, Susanne; Heinz, Reinhard; Juréwitz, Peter; Kull, Ulrich; Meyle, Wolfgang; Müller, Roland; Raberg, Frank; Rees, Werner (2004). Zuffenhausen. Village – Town – City District. Zuffenhausen, Baden-Württemberg: Association For the Promotion of Home and Care Partnership and of Young and Old People. ISBN 3-00-013395-X.
- Haffner, Sebastian (1 March 2004). Die deutsche Revolution 1918/19 (in German). Reinbek, Schleswig-Holstein: Rowohlt Verlag. ISBN 3-463-40423-0.
- Kirn, Daniel (2007). Stuttgart – Eine kleine Stadtgeschichte. Stroud, Gloucestershire: Sutton. ISBN 978-3-86680-137-0.
- Kitchen, Martin (4 September 2000). Illustrated History of History. Cambridge Illustrated Histories. Cambridge University Press. ISBN 978-0-521-45341-7.
- MacDonogh, Giles (24 February 2009). After the Reich: The Brutal History of the Allied Occupation. New York City: Basic Books. ISBN 978-0-465-00338-9.
- McLachlan, Gordon (2004). The Rough Guide to Germany. London, England: Rough Guides. ISBN 978-1-84353-293-4.
- Peters, Kurt; Schulte-Peevers, Andrea; Johnstone, Sarah; O'Carroll, Etain; Oliver, Jeanne; Parkinson, Tom; Williams, Nicola (2004). Germany. Melbourne, Australia: Lonely Planet. ISBN 978-1-74059-471-4.
- Schulte-Peevers, Andrea; Christiani, Kerry; Di Duca, Marc; Le Nevez, Catherine (15 March 2016). "Stuttgart and the Black Forest". Germany. Melbourne, Australia: Lonely Planet. ISBN 978-1-74321-023-9.
- Schlaich, Klaus; Heckel, Martin; Heun, Werner (1997). Gesammelte Aufsätze: Kirche und Staat von der Reformation bis zum Grundgesetz (in German). Mohr Siebeck. ISBN 978-3-16-146727-1.
- Wilson, Peter (2009). The Thirty Years War: Europe's Tragedy. Cambridge, Cambridgeshire: Belknap Press. ISBN 978-0-674-03634-5.

=== Further reading ===
Published in the 19th century

- "Stuttgart", Southern Germany and Austria (2nd ed.), Coblenz: Karl Baedeker, 1871, OCLC 4090237, OL 20619468M
- W. Pembroke Fetridge (1881), "Stuttgart", Harper's Hand-book for Travellers in Europe and the East, New York: Harper & Brothers

Published in the 20th century

- "Stuttgart", Guide through Germany, Austria-Hungary, Switzerland, Italy, France, Belgium, Holland, the United Kingdom, Spain, Portugal, &c (9th ed.), Berlin: J.H. Herz, 1908, OCLC 36795367
- Hagel, Jürgen: Mensch und Natur im Stuttgarter Raum. Silberburg-Verlag, Tübingen 2001, ISBN 3-87407-385-8.
- Hagel, Jürgen: Das Paradies des Neckars Bad Cannstatt. In: Wolfgang Niess, Sönke Lorenz (Hrsg.): Kult-Bäder und Bäderkultur in Baden-Württemberg. Markstein-Verlag, Filderstadt 2004, ISBN 3-935129-16-5.
- Kreh, Ulrike: Naturdenkmale Stuttgart. Naturschätze vor der Haustüre. Hrsg. v. Amt für Umweltschutz der Landeshauptstadt Stuttgart. verlag regionalkultur Ubstadt-Weiher, 2005, ISBN 3-89735-405-5.
- Hermann Lenz: Stuttgart. Portrait einer Stadt. Insel Verlag, Frankfurt am Main/Leipzig 2003, ISBN 3-458-17158-4.
- Ostertag, Roland (Hrsg.): Das Bosch-Areal. Verlag Karl Krämer, Stuttgart 2004, ISBN 3-7828-1613-7.
- Ostertag, Roland (Hrsg.): Stuttgart... wohin? Band 2, mit Beiträgen von Max Bächer, Helmut Böhme, Otto Borst, Hermann Hesse, Timo John, Wolfgang Kil, Arno Lederer, Roland Ostertag, Frei Otto, Hannelore Schlaffer, Walter Siebel, Klaus Töpfer. Karl Krämer Verlag, Stuttgart 2004, ISBN 3-7828-4042-9.
- Schaefer, Albert T.: Stuttgart Panorama. Mit Texten von Manfred Rommel. edition braus, Heidelberg 2006, ISBN 3-89904-224-7 (Fotoband).
- Schäfer, Hartmut: Befunde aus der "Archäologischen Wüste:" Die Stiftskirche und das Alte Schloss in Stuttgart. Denkmalpflege in Baden-Württemberg 31, 2002, S. 249–258.
- Zelzer, Maria (Hrsg.): Stuttgart unterm Hakenkreuz. Chronik 1933–1945. Cordeliers, Stuttgart 1983, ISBN 3-608-91931-7.

Preceded by Zagreb, Yugoslavia (1957)	World Gymnaestrada host city 1961	Succeeded by Vienna, Austria (1965)
