= List of streets and squares in Stuttgart =

This is a list of notable streets and squares in Stuttgart, Germany.

== Streets ==
Image	Degerloch	Notes	Landmarks

== Squares ==
Image	Name	Notes	Landmarks
	Arnulf-Klett-Platz		Bonatzbau, Hindenburgbau
	Berliner Platz		
	Bismarckplatz		
	Börsenplatz		Friedrichsbau
	Charlottenplatz		Stadtbahnhaltestelle
	Schillerplatz	The monument to Friedrich Schiller, designed by Nikolaus Friedrich von Thouret and cast in bronze by Bertel Thorvaldsen in 1839, that stands in Stuttgart was the first to be erected in Germany.	The Schiller Monument, Fruchtkasten and Stiftskirche.
	Schlossplatz		The New Palace, Alte Kanzlei, Königsbau, Jubiläumssäule, and the Old Castle.
