= Christmas Market, Stuttgart =

Annual Christmas market in Germany

Coordinates: 48.3466578°N 7.1312526°E

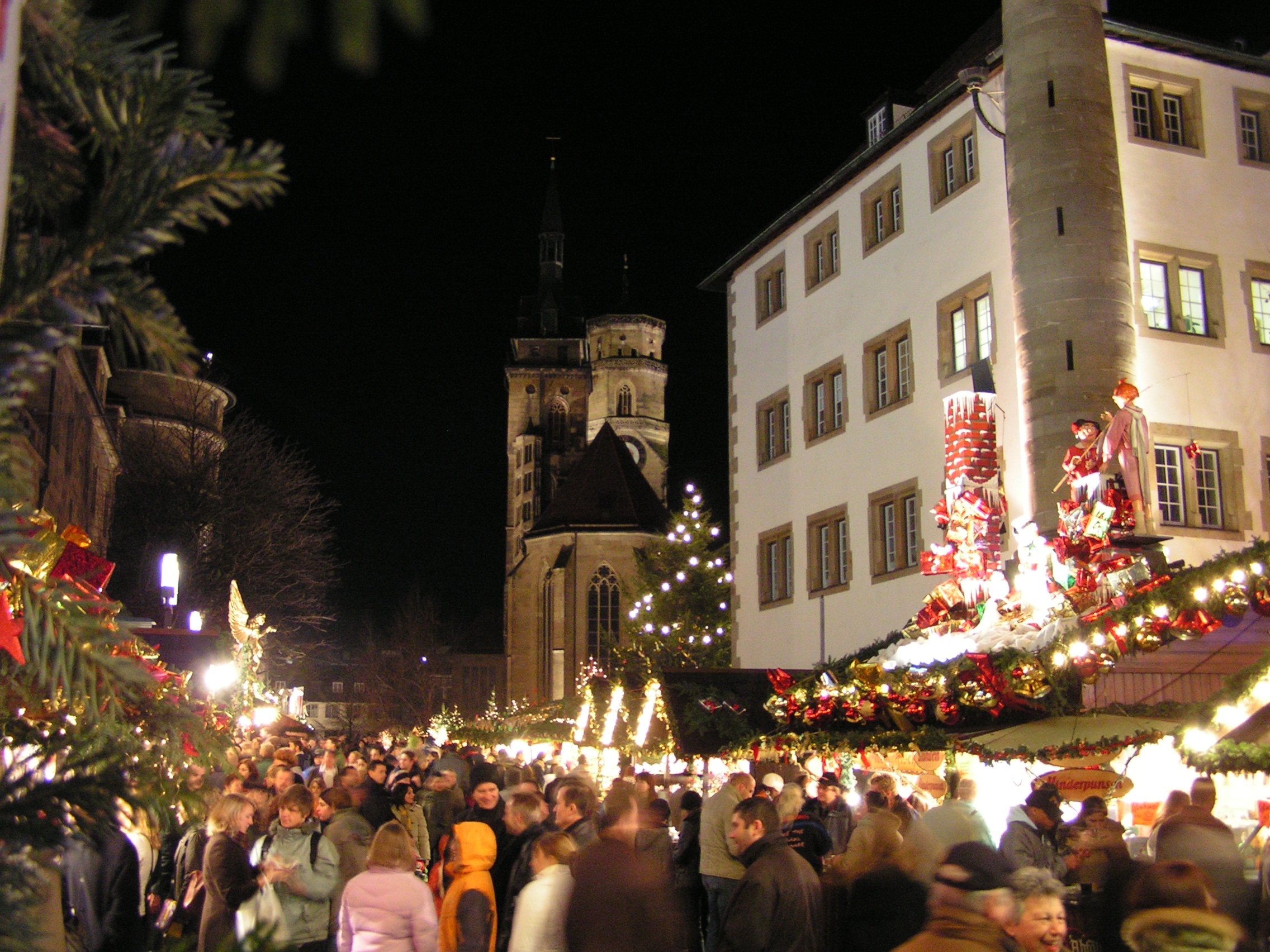
Stuttgart Christmas Market looking towards Schillerplatz

Stuttgart Christmas Market, known in German as the Stuttgarter Weihnachtsmarkt is a Christmas market that takes place every year during Advent in the German city of Stuttgart.

== History ==
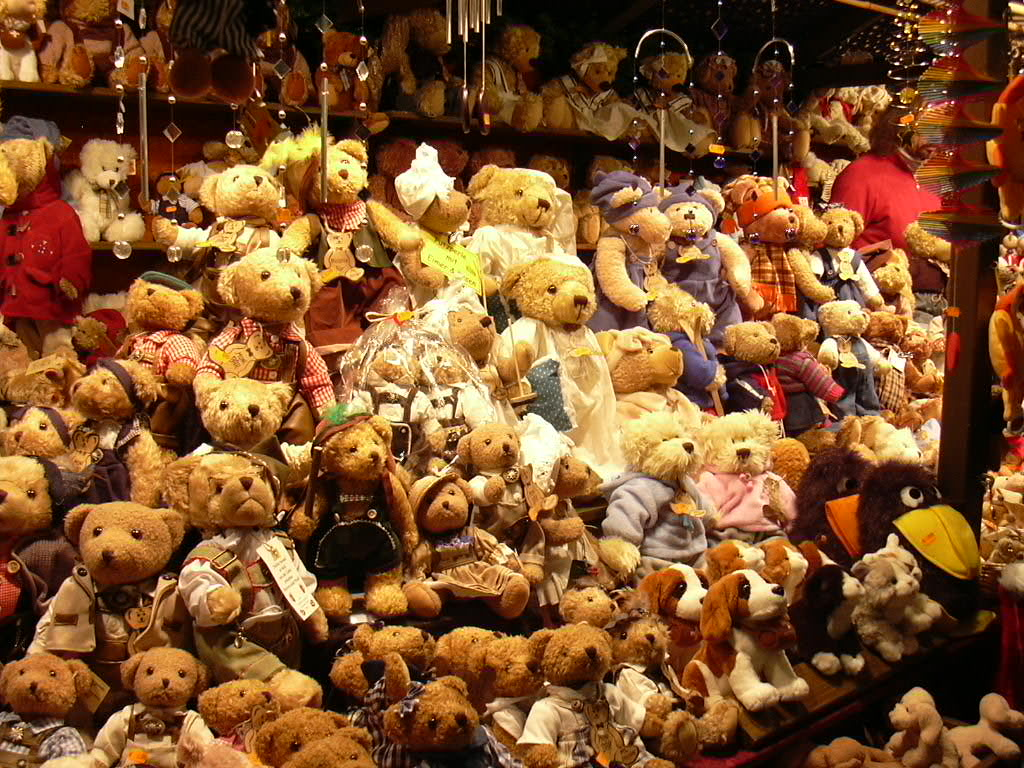
A traditional stand selling teddy bears

The Stuttgarter Weihnachtsmarkt was first mentioned in city records in 1692 when it was described as a 'traditional Stuttgart event'. The modern Christmas Market encompasses around 200 stands and is visited by around 3.6 million people every year, making it one of the largest of its kind in Germany. In terms of area, Stuttgart Christmas Market is claimed by organisers to the one in Europe with most tradition.

== Location ==
The market stretches from the west and northern edge of Stuttgart's central square (Schlossplatz, where there is a children's 'fairytale land' alongside a miniature railway and ice rink) to the old squares and alleyways of Stuttgart, including Schillerplatz, Karlsplatz (featuring a Finnish Christmas Market and a Christmas collectors' fair) and Marktplatz.

The Christmas market opens every year on the last Thursday in November in the Renaissance inner quadrangle of Stuttgart Old Castle. It is open Monday to Saturday from 10am to 9pm and on Sundays from 11am to 9pm. The market finishes on Christmas Eve.
