= Marquardtbau =

Former hotel in Stuttgart, Germany

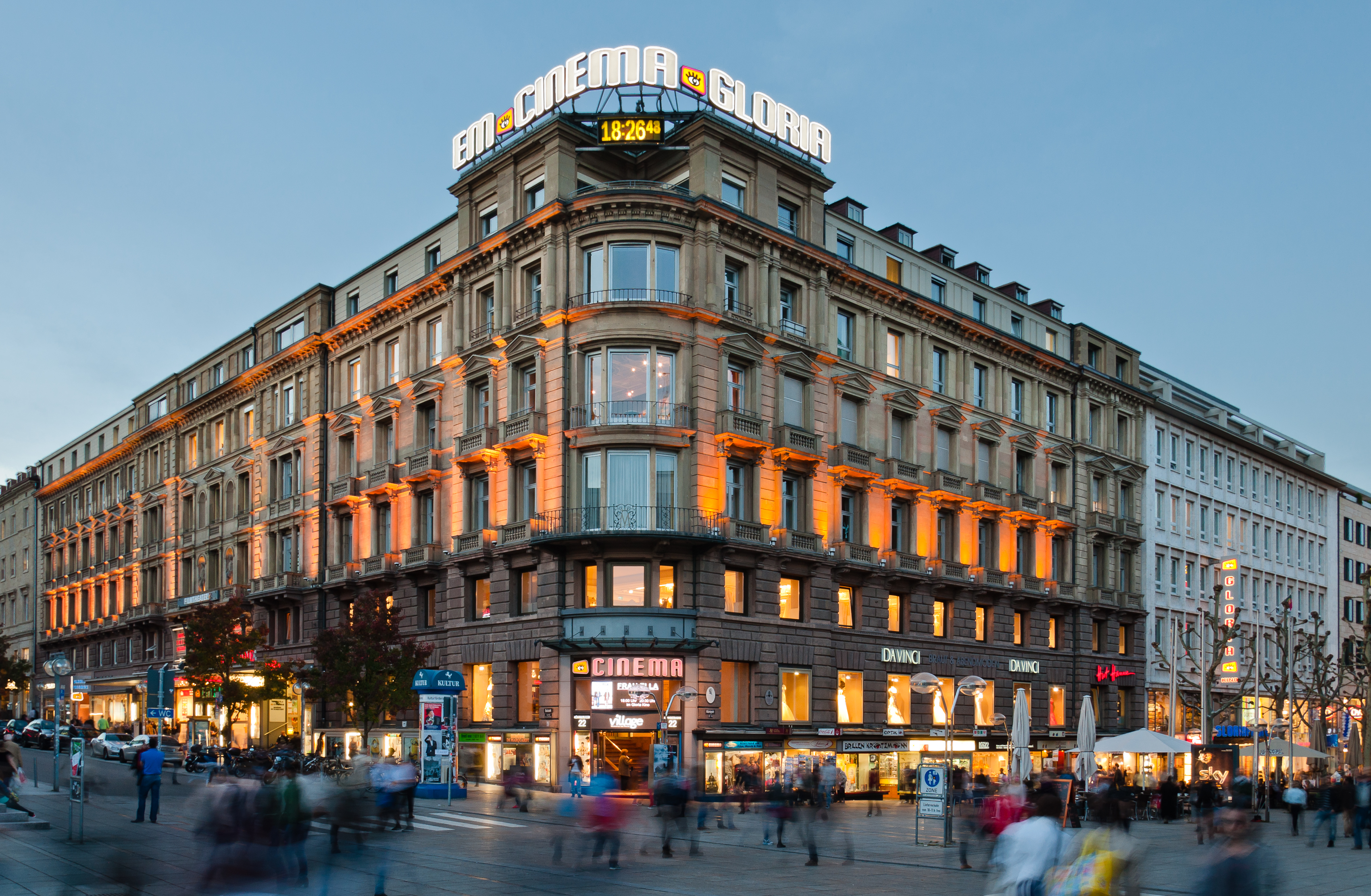
The Marquardtbau in 2013

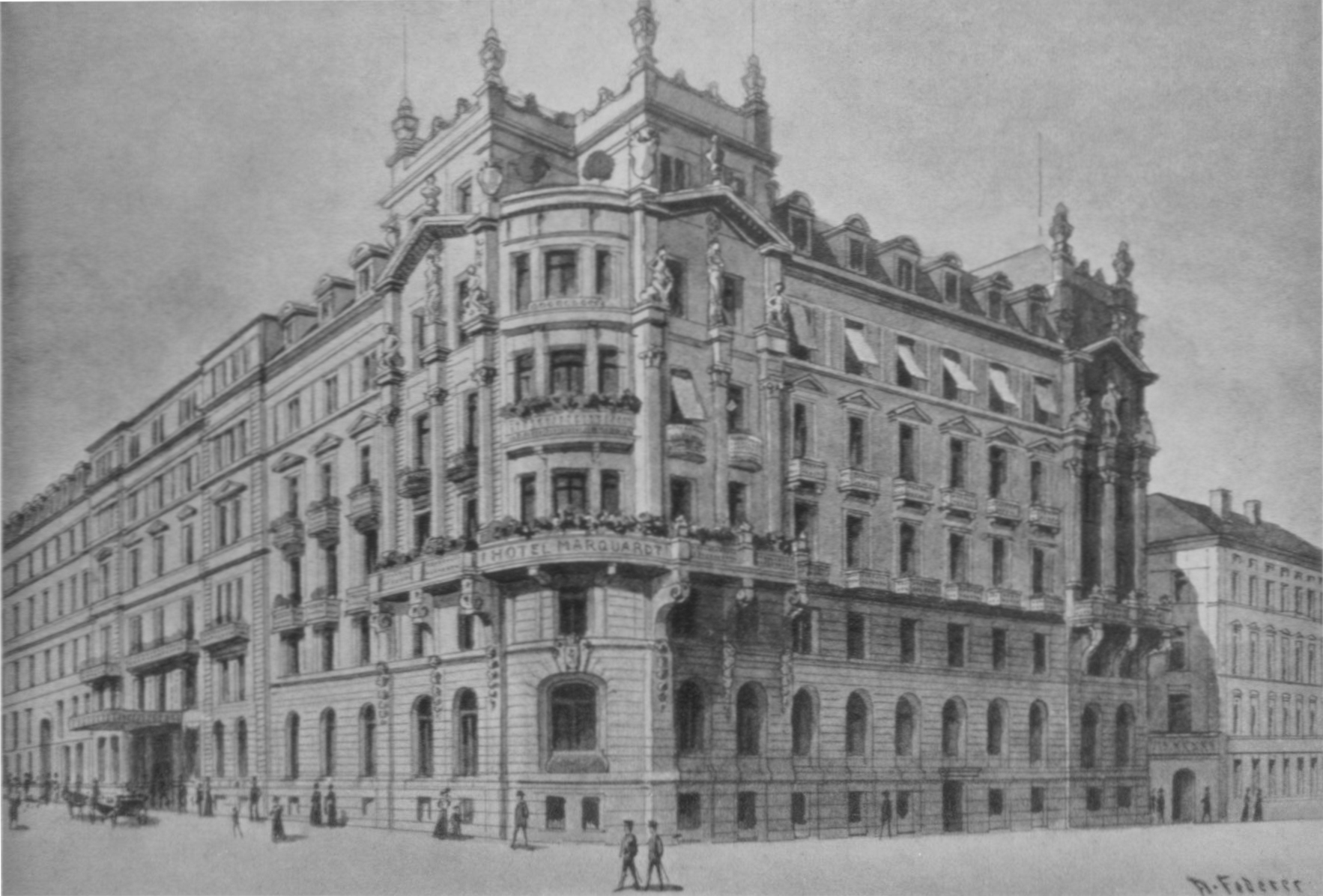
The Marquadtbau c. 1890

The Marquardtbau (German for Marquardt Building) on Stuttgart's Schlossplatz is a former hotel and now houses the theatre Komödie im Marquardt. Today, the building has around 20,000 m^{2} of floor space and is used as an office, retail and cultural building.

== Bibliography ==
- Uwe Bogen (text); Stefan Bukovsek (photos): Die Königstraße. Wo Stuttgarts Herz schlägt. Gudensberg-Gleichen 2006, p. 43–45
- Uwe Bogen (text); Thomas Wagner (photos): Stuttgart. Eine Stadt verändert ihr Gesicht. Erfurt 2012, pp. 8–9
- Ernst Marquardt: Das Hotel Marquardt in Stuttgart 1840–1938. Ein firmen- und familiengeschichtlicher Versuch (with a preface by R. Vierhaus) I. Part of: Tradition. Zeitschrift für Firmengeschichte und Unternehmerbiographie, 10, 1965, p. 49 (online version)

48.7799°N 9.1789°E
