= Old Castle (Stuttgart) =

Former palace in Stuttgart, Germany

Old Palace
- German: Altes Schloss
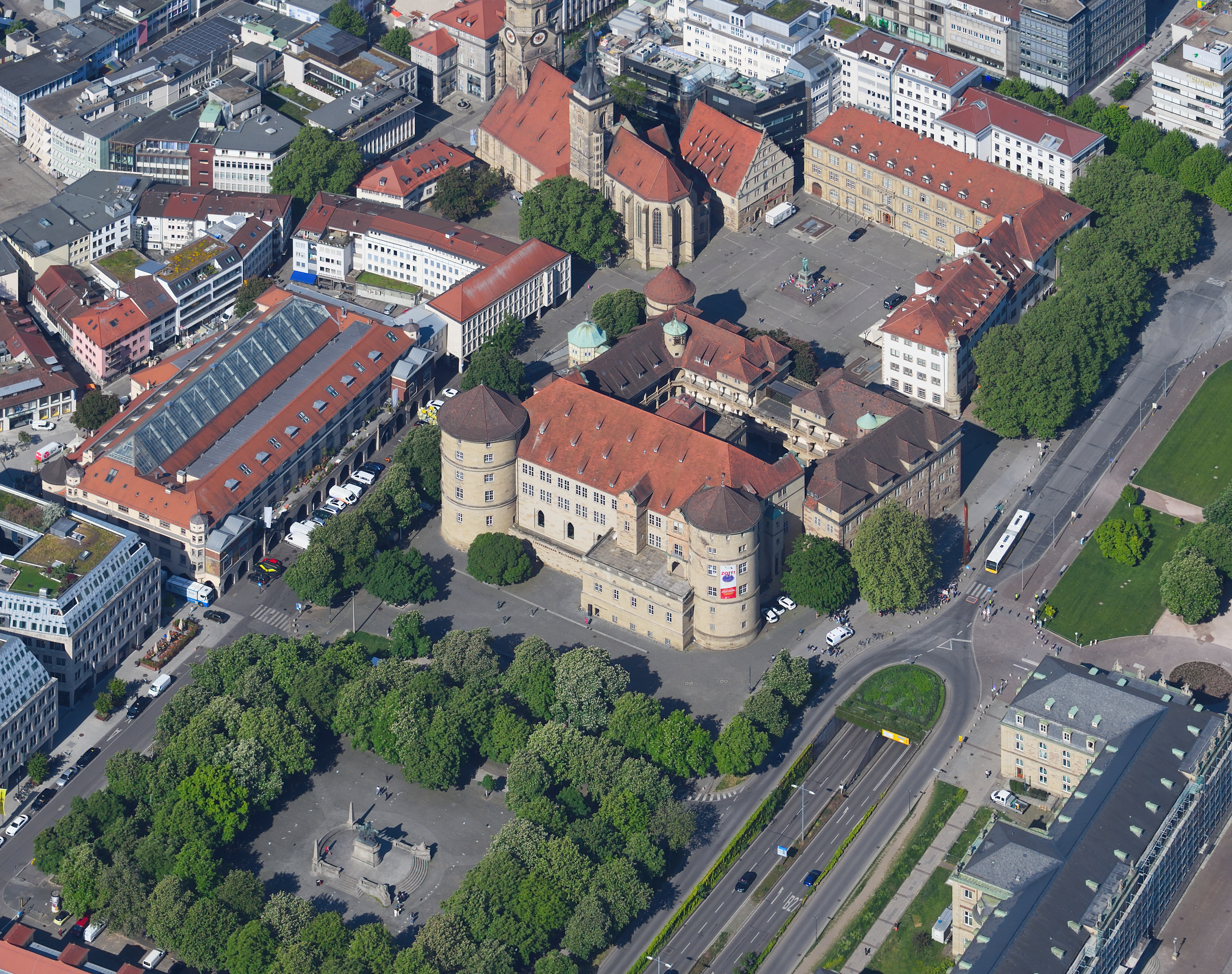
- Aerial view from the east

- Location within Baden-Württemberg Location within Germany

General information
- Status: Completed
- Location: Schillerplatz, Stuttgart-Center, Stuttgart, Germany
- Coordinates: 48°46′38″N 9°10′45″E

The Old Palace (German: Altes Schloss) is a former castle located on the Schillerplatz in Stuttgart, Germany. The castle, originally a water castle dating back to the 10th century, was the residence of the Counts and later some Dukes of Württemberg and today is the home of the Landesmuseum Württemberg. The castle church (German: Schloßkirche) still functions as a place of worship.

== History ==
In the year 950 AD, a castle was completed on the grounds of the Old Castle to protect the mare garden. In the 14th century, it was the home of the Counts of Württemberg and their Court Chamber. From 1553-1578, Dukes Christoph and Louis III renovated the castle adding an equestrian staircase built by Blasius Berwart in 1560 and the church and conference room in 1562. In the 18th century, the moat was filled.

In 1931, the castle's dirnitz and two towers were destroyed by fire. The castle again saw damage, and large parts of the ethnographic collection of the Landesmuseum Württemberg fell victim to fire, during World War II before being renovated in 1971. Paul Schmitthenner renovated the castle in 1971.

The arcaded courtyard of the castle itself shows architectural motifs of the early Italian Renaissance.

King Charles I of Württemberg and his wife Olga are buried beneath the castle church. The inner courtyard houses a monument to Eberhard I. The Old Castle stands adjacent to its replacement, the New Castle, which was built in the late 18th century.

On the Karlsplatz side of the Old Castle is a museum dedicated to the memory of Claus von Stauffenberg a former resident of Stuttgart who attempted to assassinate Adolf Hitler on 20 July 1944.

== Landesmuseum Württemberg ==
In the Landesmuseum's exhibits are Stone Age and Roman artifacts, paintings, and a recounting of ancient regional history.

== See also ==
- Duchy of Württemberg
- Kingdom of Württemberg

== Gallery ==
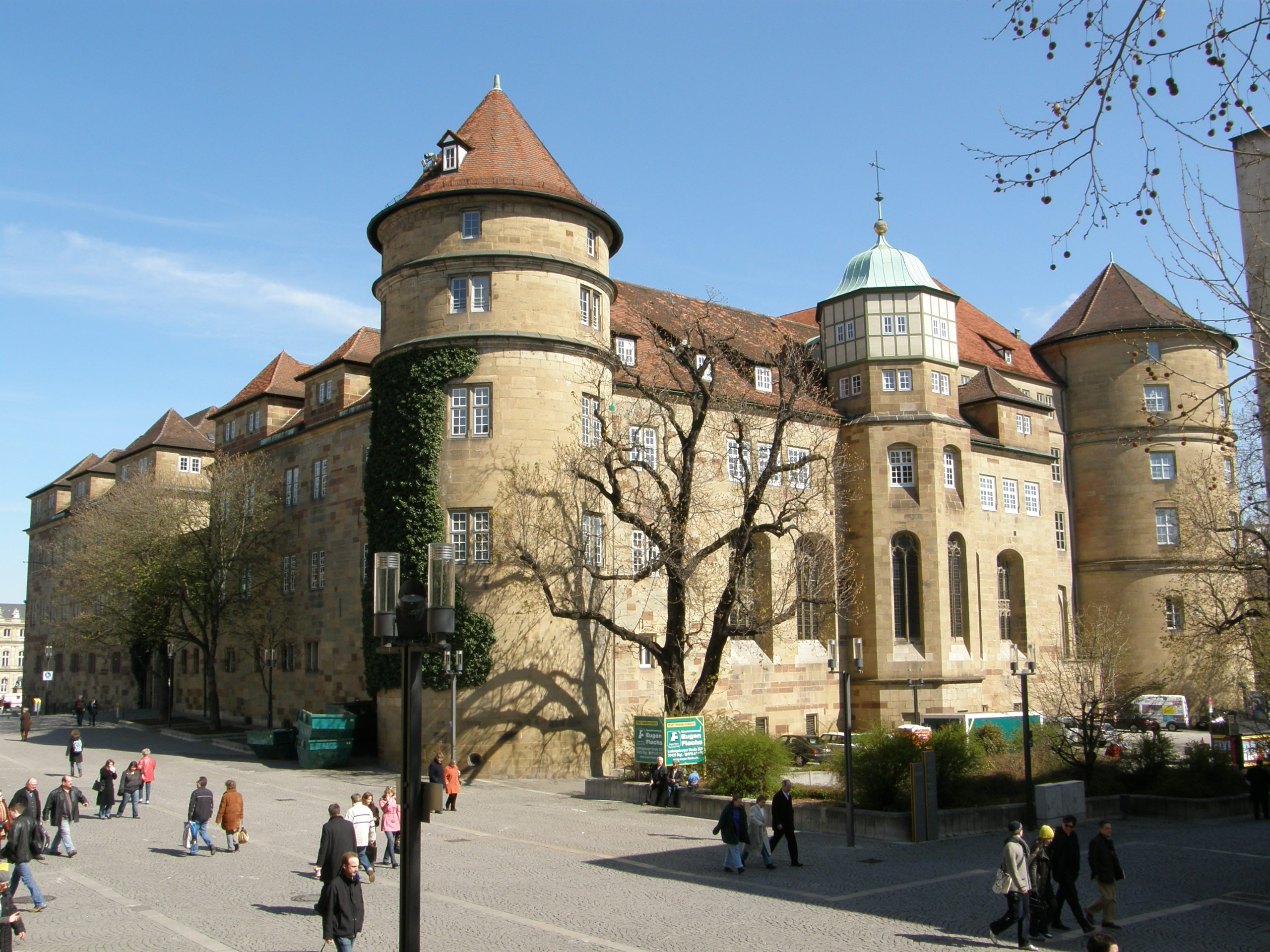
View from Schlossplatz

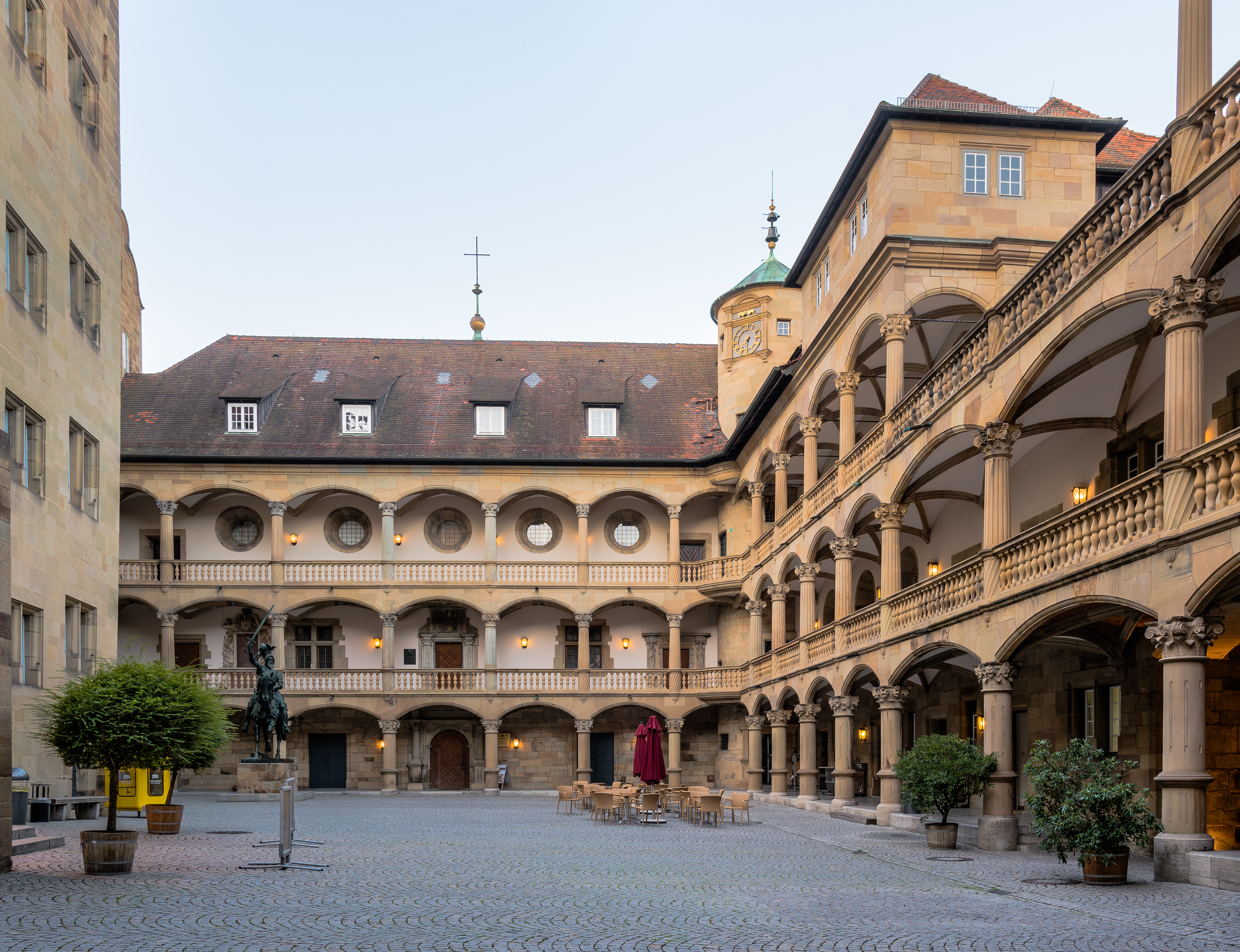
Inner courtyard in 2015

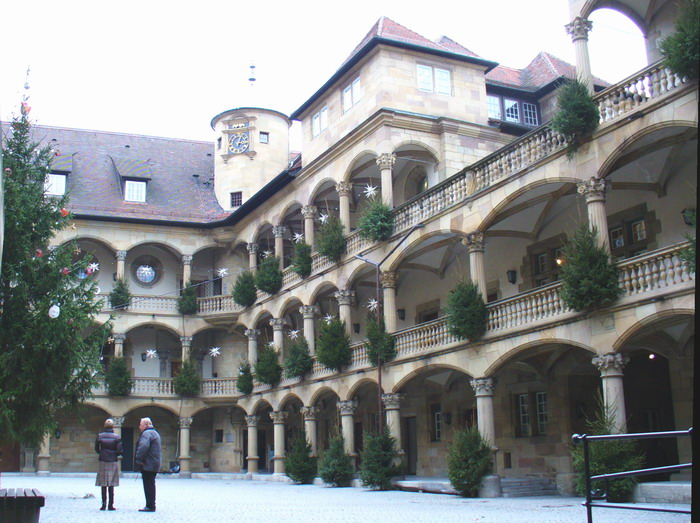
Inner courtyard with Christmas decorations.

Schlosskirche

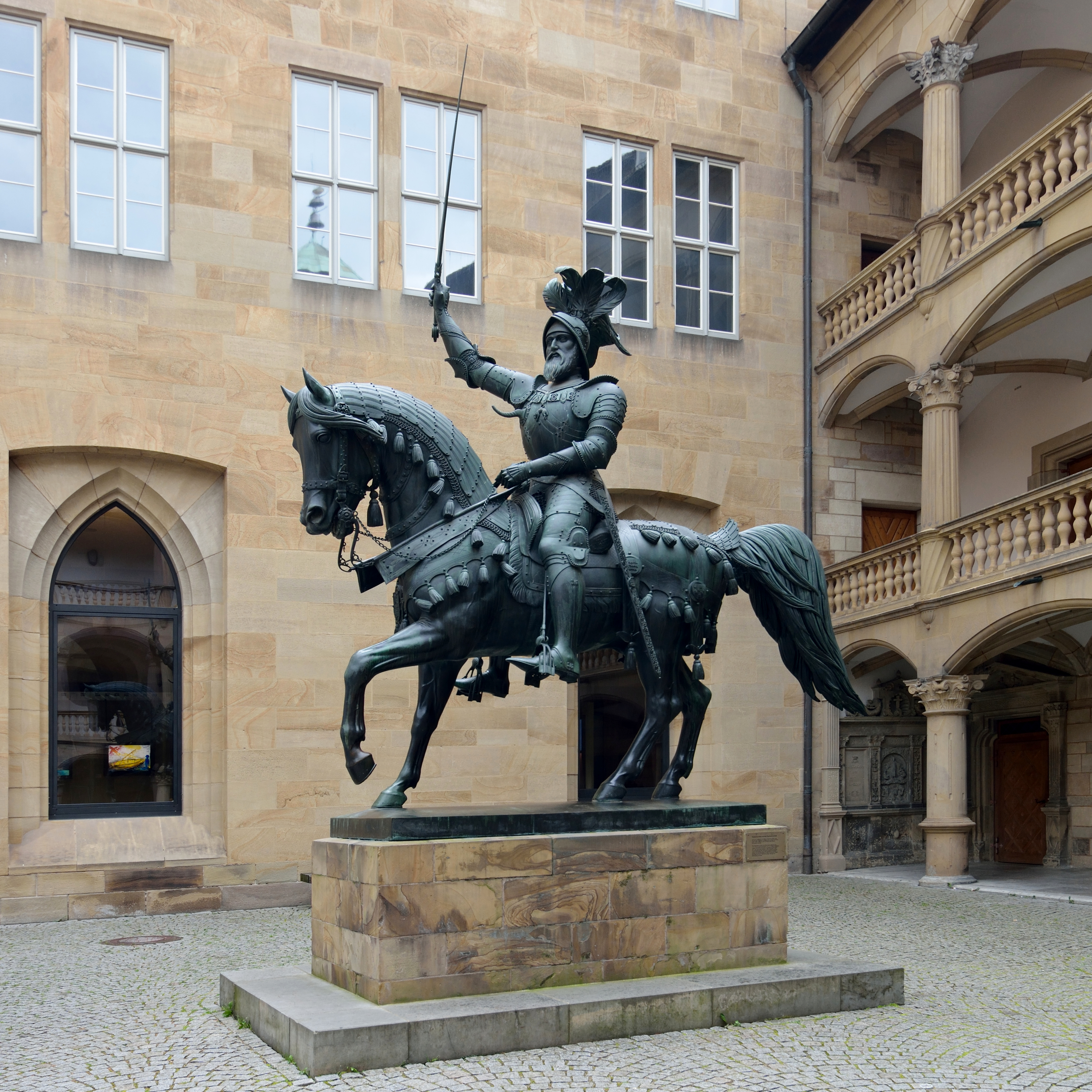
Monument of count Eberhard I

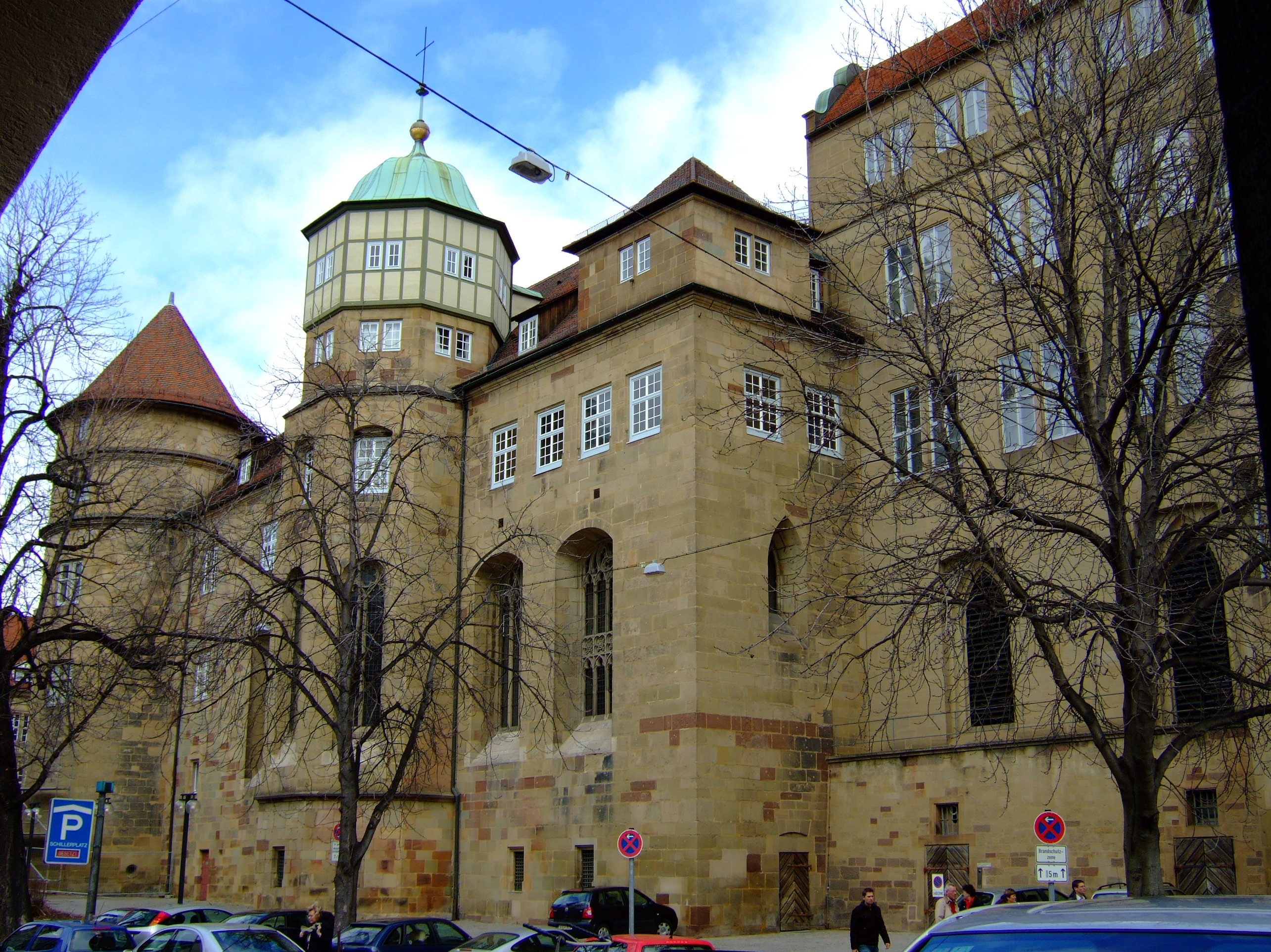
The Old Castle viewed from the nearby market hall

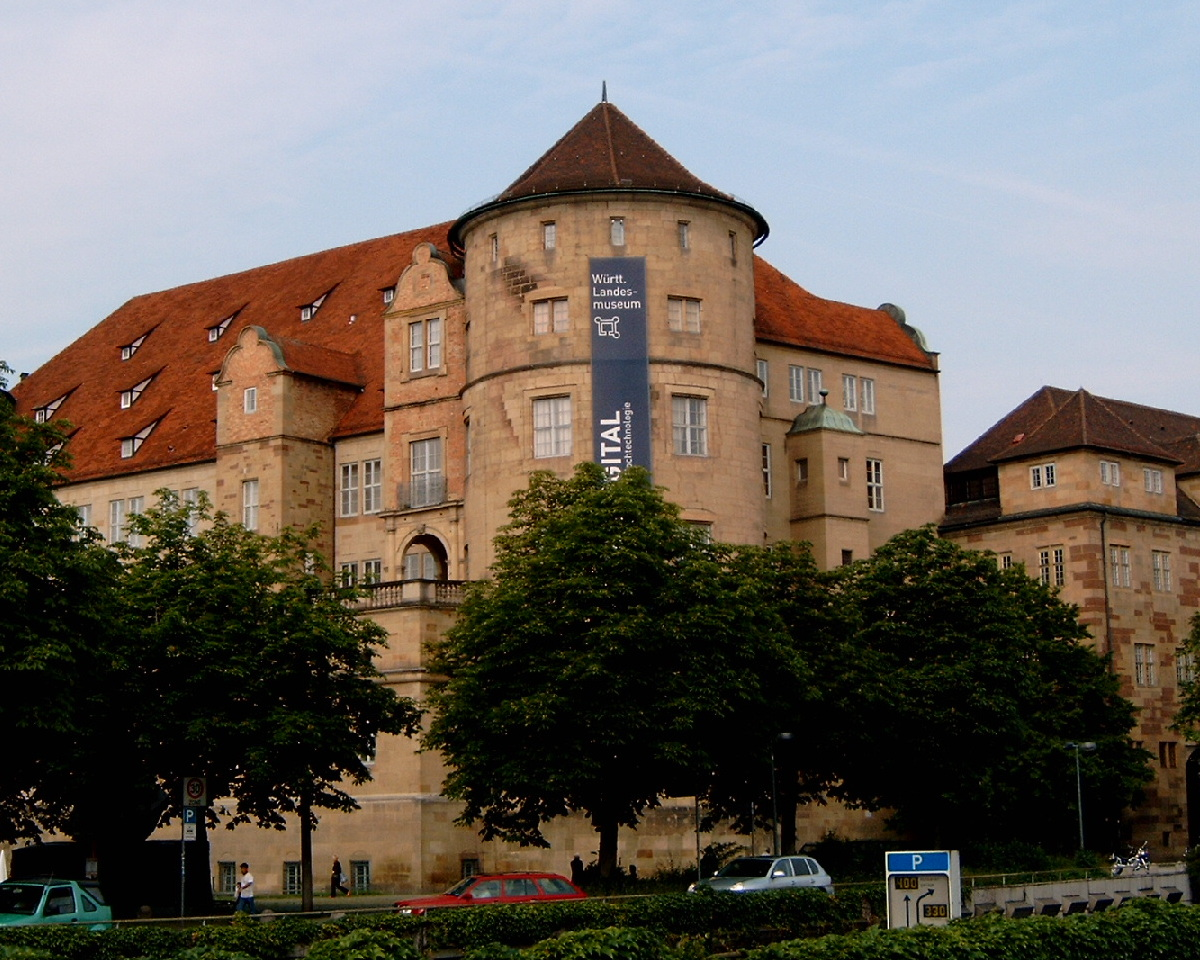
The south west corner
