= Schillerplatz (Stuttgart) =

Square in Stuttgart, Germany

Coordinates: 48°46′37.76″N 9°10′42.48″E

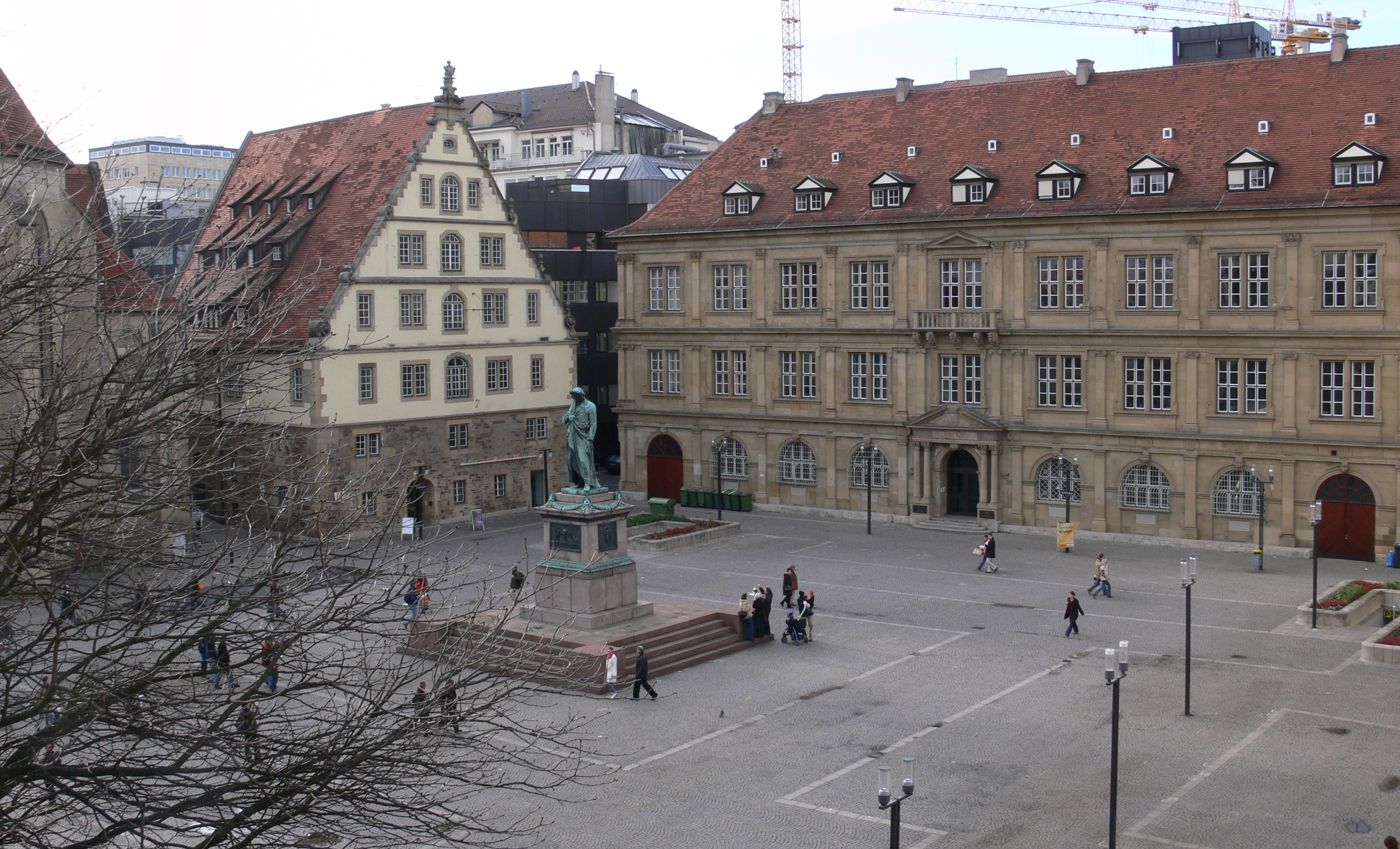
Schillerplatz showing the Fruchtkasten building on the left and Prinzenbau on the right. In the centre: the Schiller memorial.

Schillerplatz (German pronunciation: [ˈʃɪlɐˌplats], lit. 'Schiller Square') is a square in the old city centre of Stuttgart, Germany named in honour of the German poet, philosopher, historian, and dramatist Friedrich Schiller. Schillerplatz stands to the south west of Stuttgart's main square, Schlossplatz.

== Buildings around Schillerplatz ==
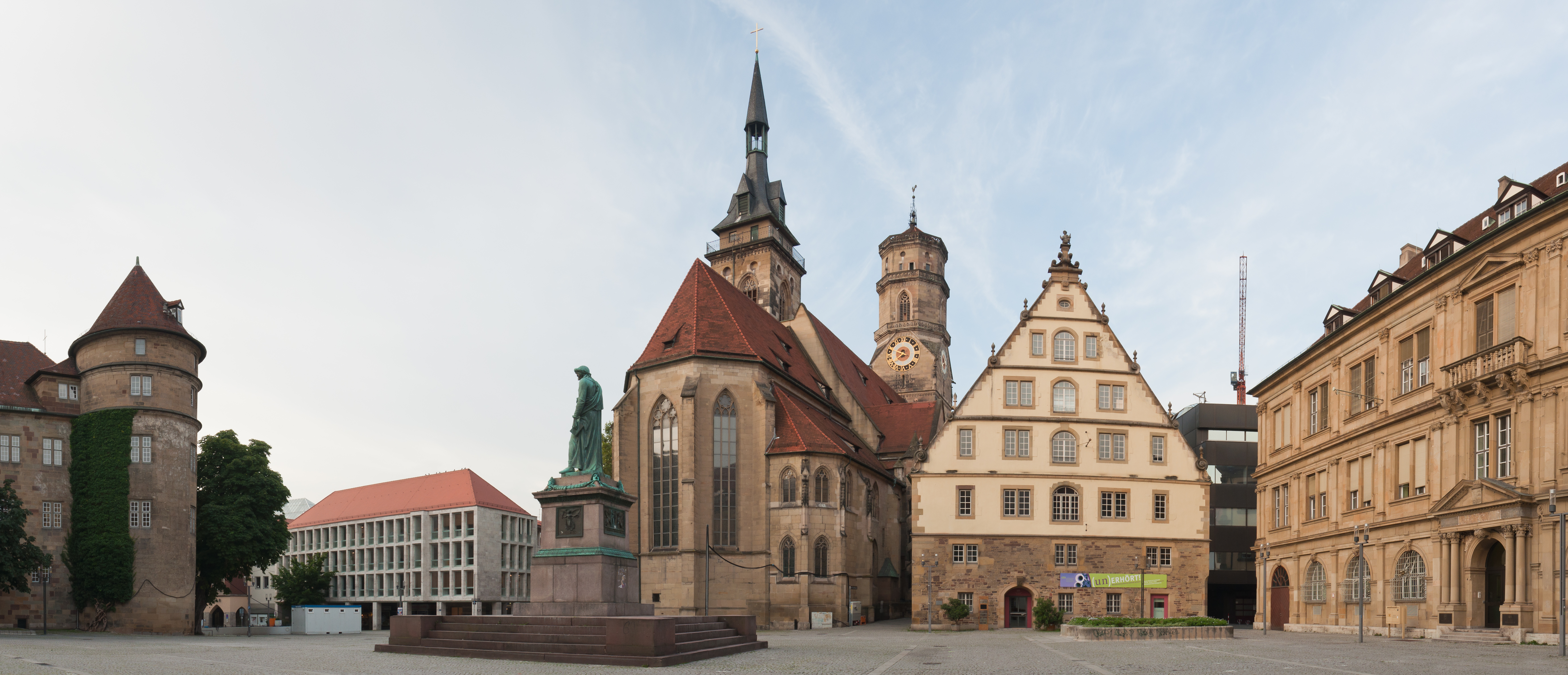
Schillerplatz with the Old Castle, the Schiller memorial, the Collegiate Church, Fruchtkasten and the Prinzenbau

Starting in the south west corner, Schillerplatz is surrounded by the Stiftskirche (Collegiate Church), the Fruchtkasten building, the Prinzenbau (which now houses the Baden-Württemberg Ministry of Justice, the Alte Kanzlei (Old Chancellery) and Altes Schloss (the Old Castle).

A street market takes place twice a week on Schillerplatz. The square is also used for major events taking place on Marktplatz (Stuttgart's Market Square) such as the annual Christmas Market. Hidden underneath Schillerplatz's cobblestones is an underground car park.

The late Gothic Fruchtkasten building in the corner of Schillerplatz is now used by the State Museum of Württemberg to house a collection of musical instruments.

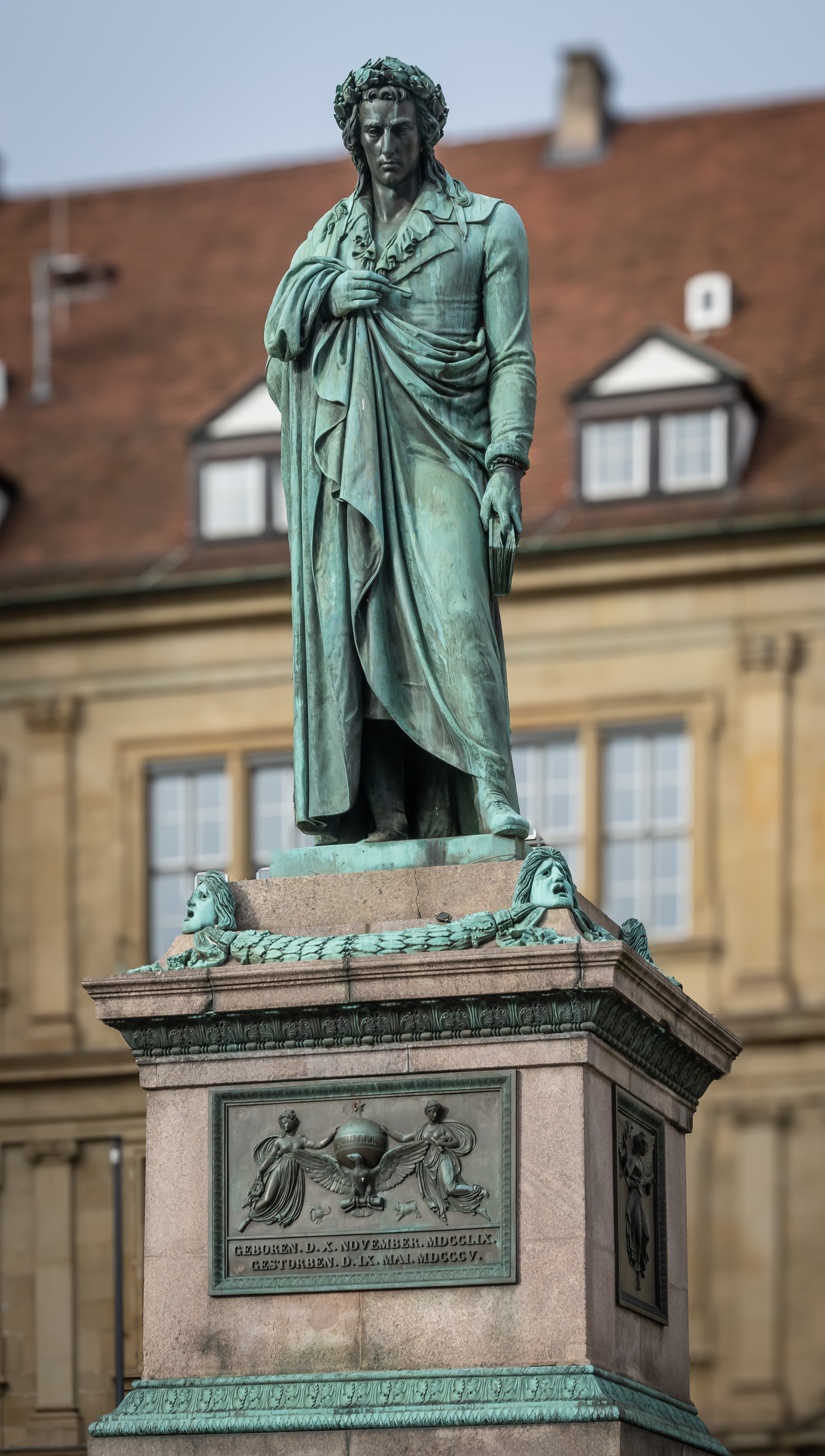
The Schiller memorial

== The Schiller memorial ==
At the centre of the cobblestone square is a memorial to Friedrich Schiller which was erected in 1839 by the Danish sculptor Bertel Thorvaldsen. Thorvaldsen's statue was the first memorial to Schiller to be erected in Germany.

== History ==
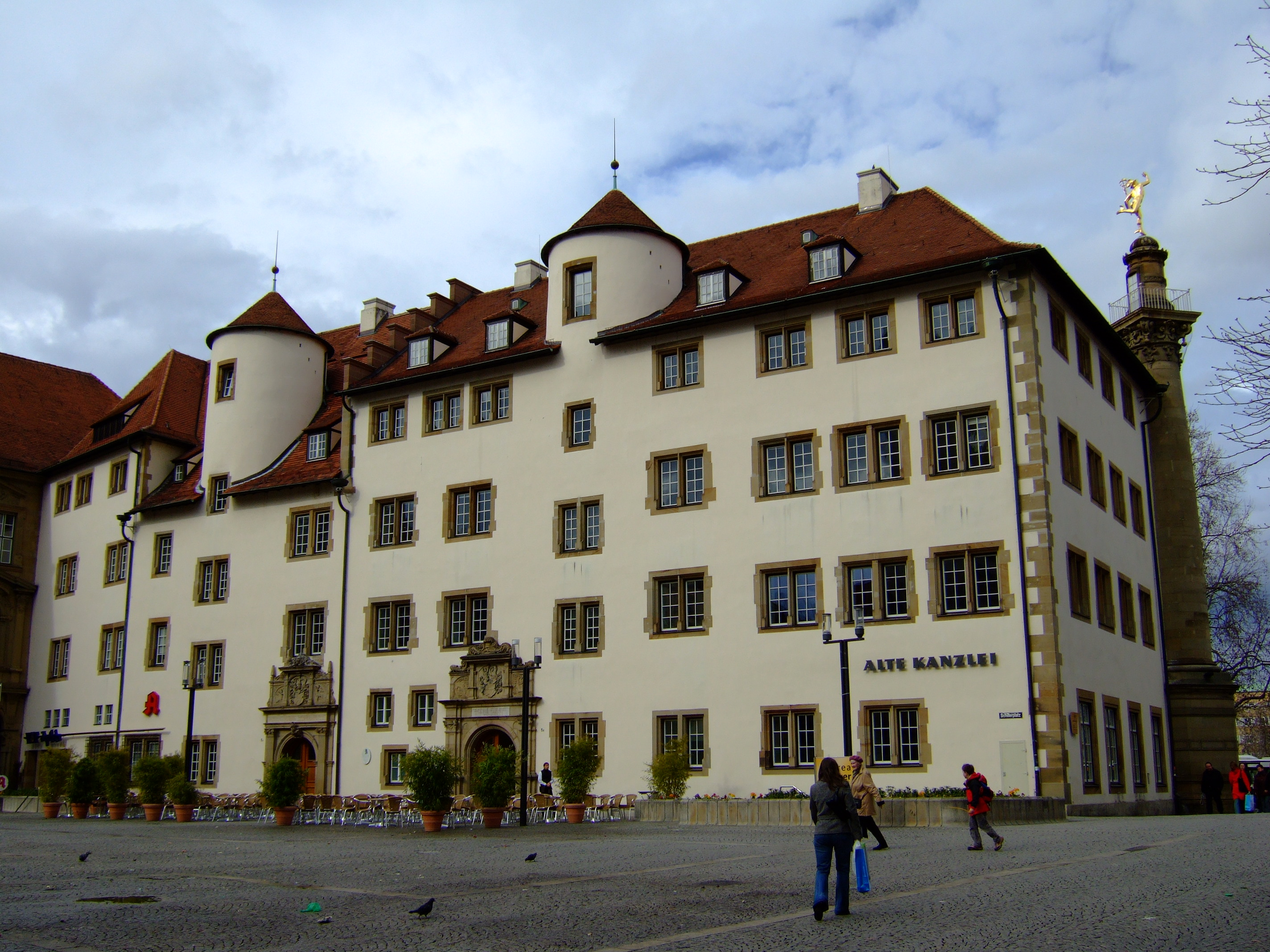
Alte Kanzlei (The Old Chancellery)

The first known brick building in Stuttgart - the Stuthaus or mare house - stood next to the adjacent Stiftskirche (collegiate church). It is therefore supposed that the square was originally used as a horse breeding area around 1000 years ago (in keeping with Stuttgart's history). After the 12th century the square was probably covered in simple houses before other stone houses such as the Fruchtkasten were built. In the mid-14th century the Dürnitzbau wing of the Old Castle (next to Schillerplatz) was erected. The Old Chancellery was built in 1542 shortly before completion of the Arkadenflügel wing of the Old Castle. The area between the Old Castle and the Chancellery became a moat.

In 1594 Duke Friedrich I asked his master builder Heinrich Schickhardt to turn today's Schillerplatz into a Renaissance square. Residents' houses were bought and demolished. The new square was laid with cobblestones and called 'Castle and Chancellery Square'. The dimensions of the square have not changed since.

In 1607 work began on the Gesandtenhaus (a type of ambassador's house) which is now known as the Prinzenbau and was finally completed in 1677. In 1711 the Prinzenbau was extended behind the Old Chancellery with an arch in the northernmost corner of Schillerplatz. On the opposite, southern side of the square between the Old Castle and Stiftskirche the first Stuttgart Café opened in 1712. It was replaced in 1798 by the König von England inn (King of England Inn). This was shortly after the moat surrounding the Old Castle had finally been filled in leaving the square the way it stands today.

The square was officially renamed Schillerplatz in 1934 in memory of one of Baden-Württemberg's most famous writers and intellectuals.

During the Second World War of the buildings around Schillerplatz were burnt down but all were reconstructed after the war with the exception of the King of England Inn.

The underground car park was built in 1972-3.

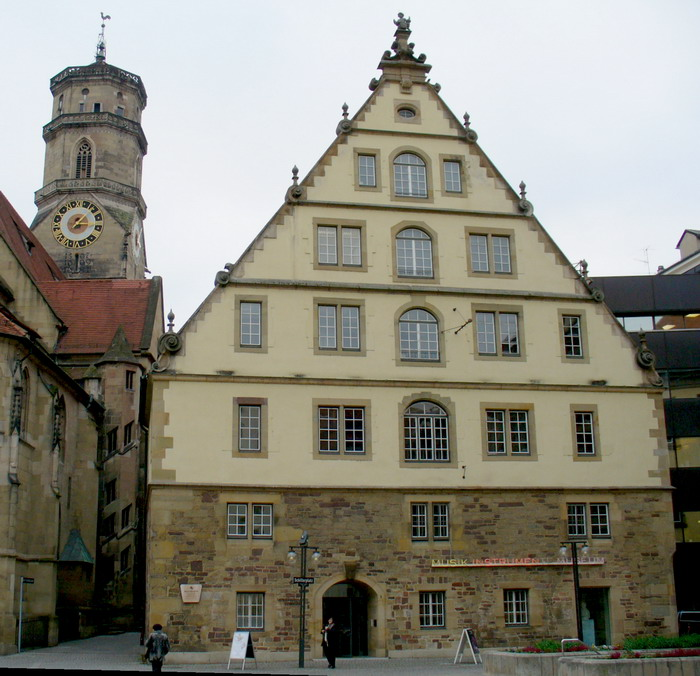
The Fruchtkasten building

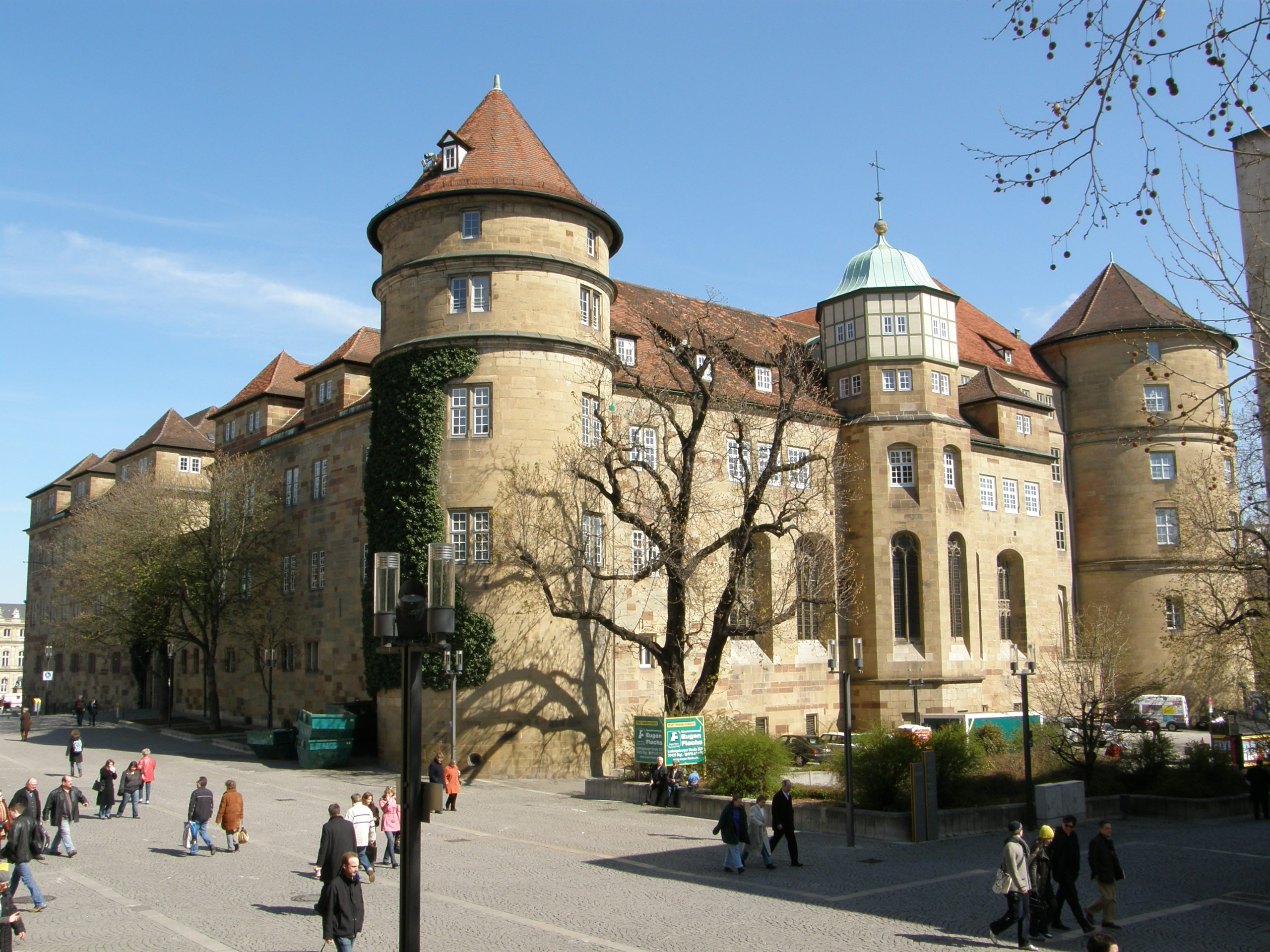
The Old Castle

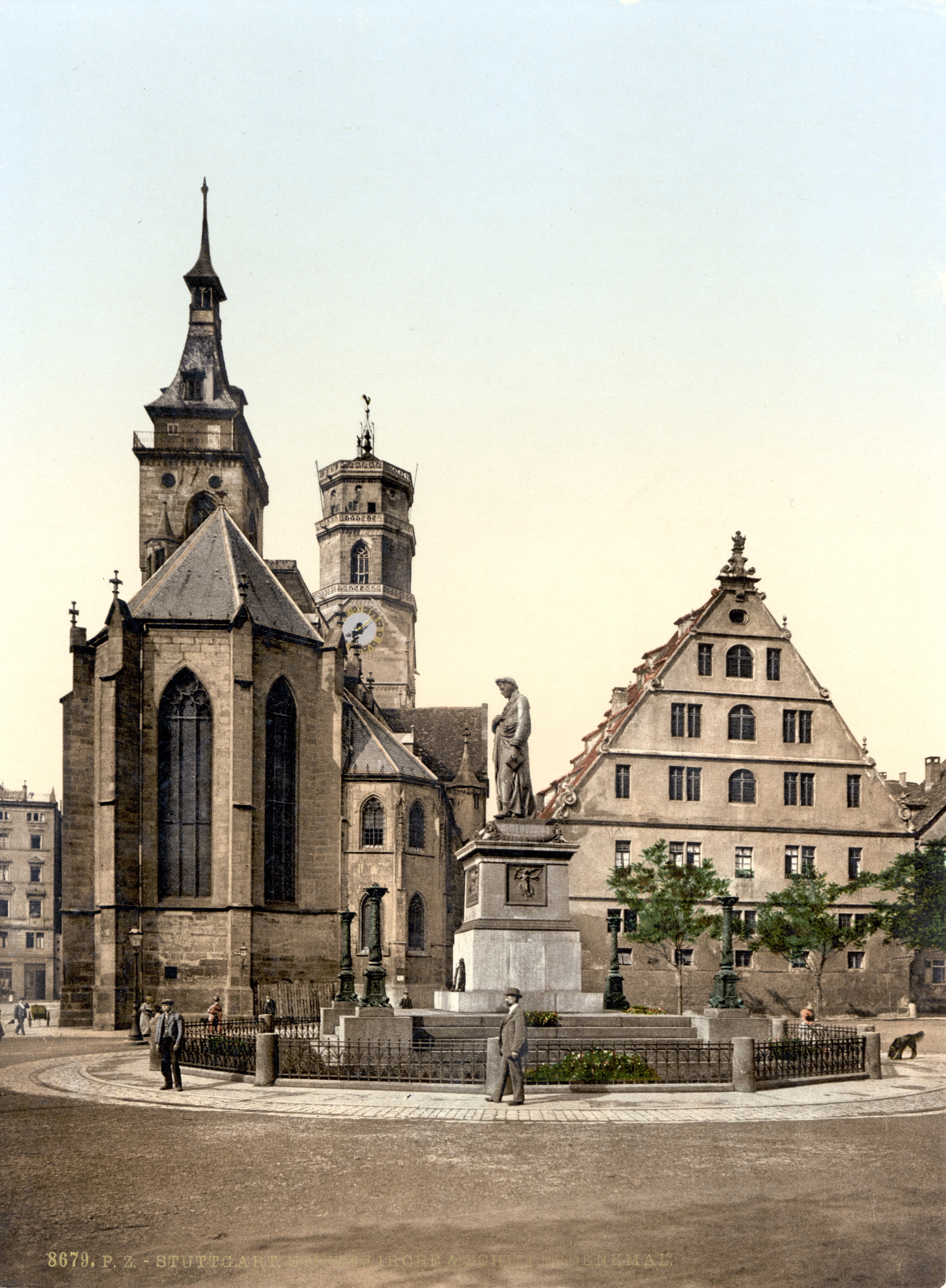
Schillerplatz around 1900

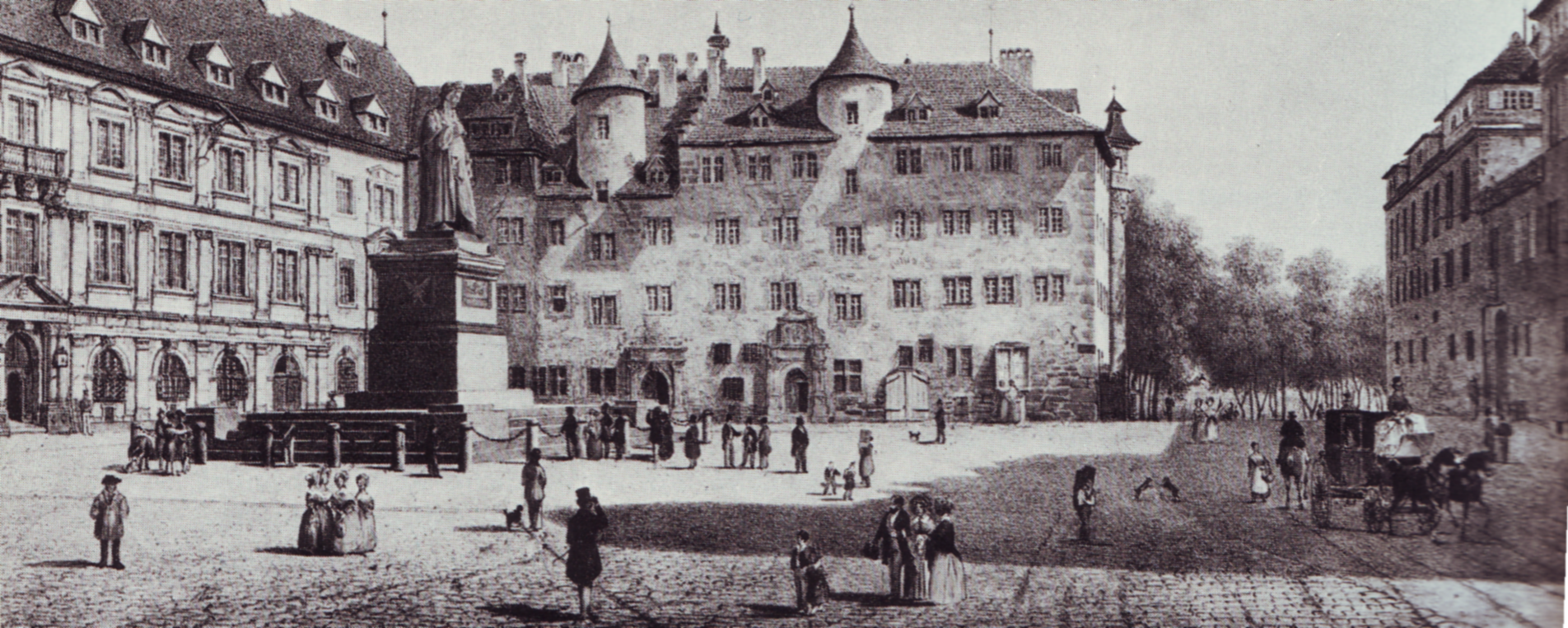
Schillerplatz in 1839
