= Schlossplatz (Stuttgart) =

Square in Stuttgart

Coordinates: 48°46′42.78″N 9°10′47.68″E

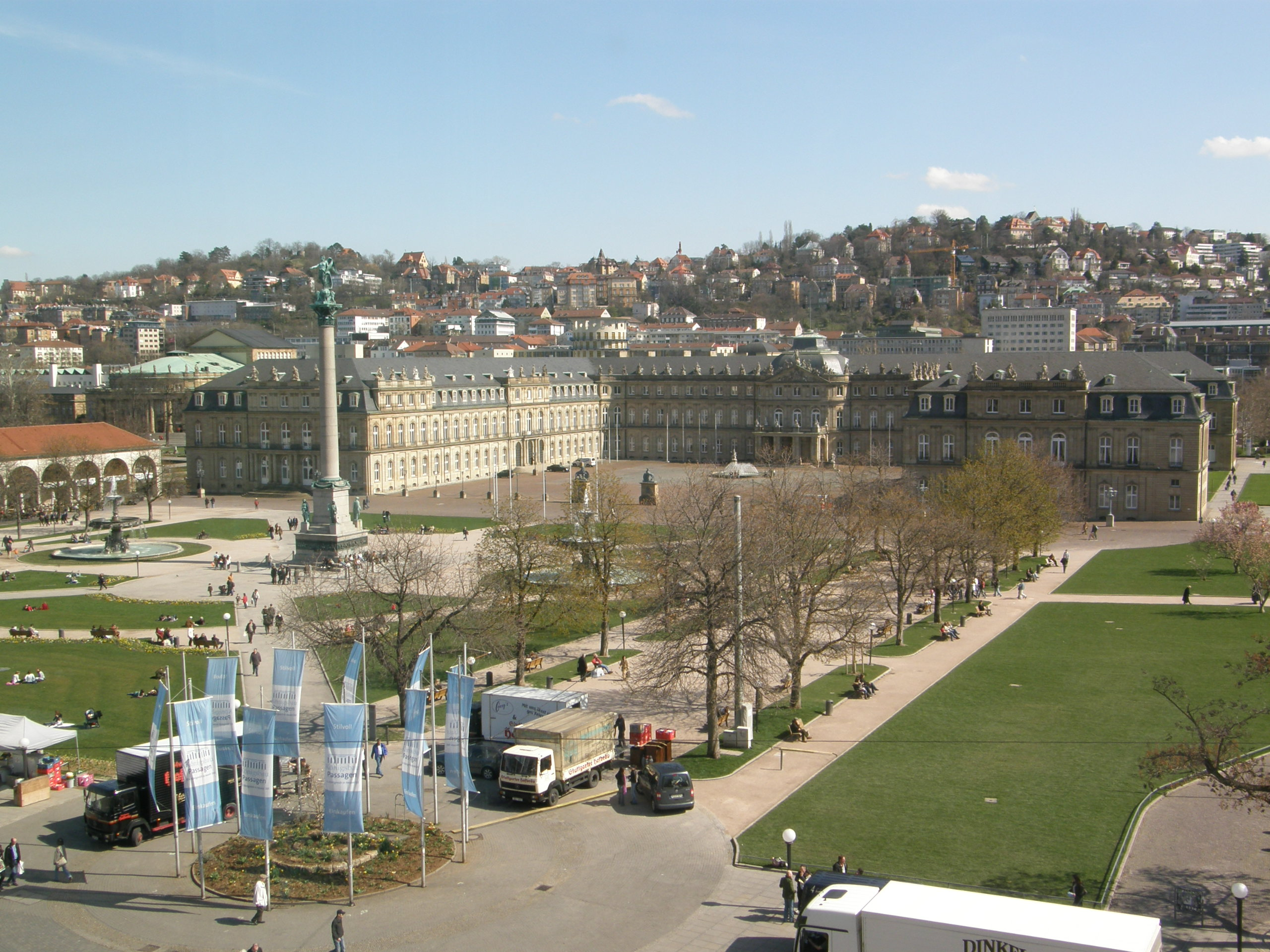
Schlossplatz looking towards the New Castle

Schlossplatz, Stuttgart

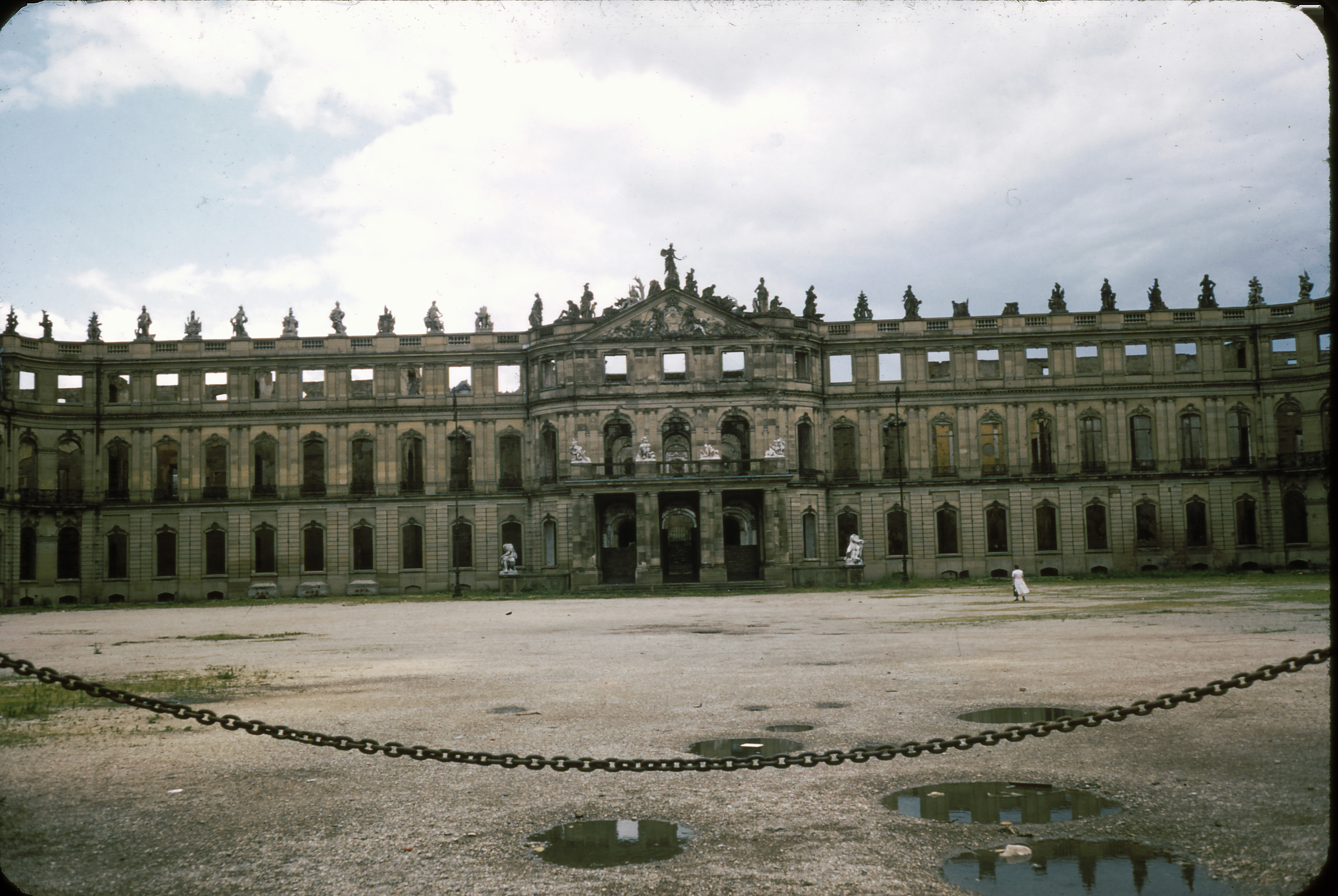
Heavily damaged Neues Schloss in 1956 before restoration

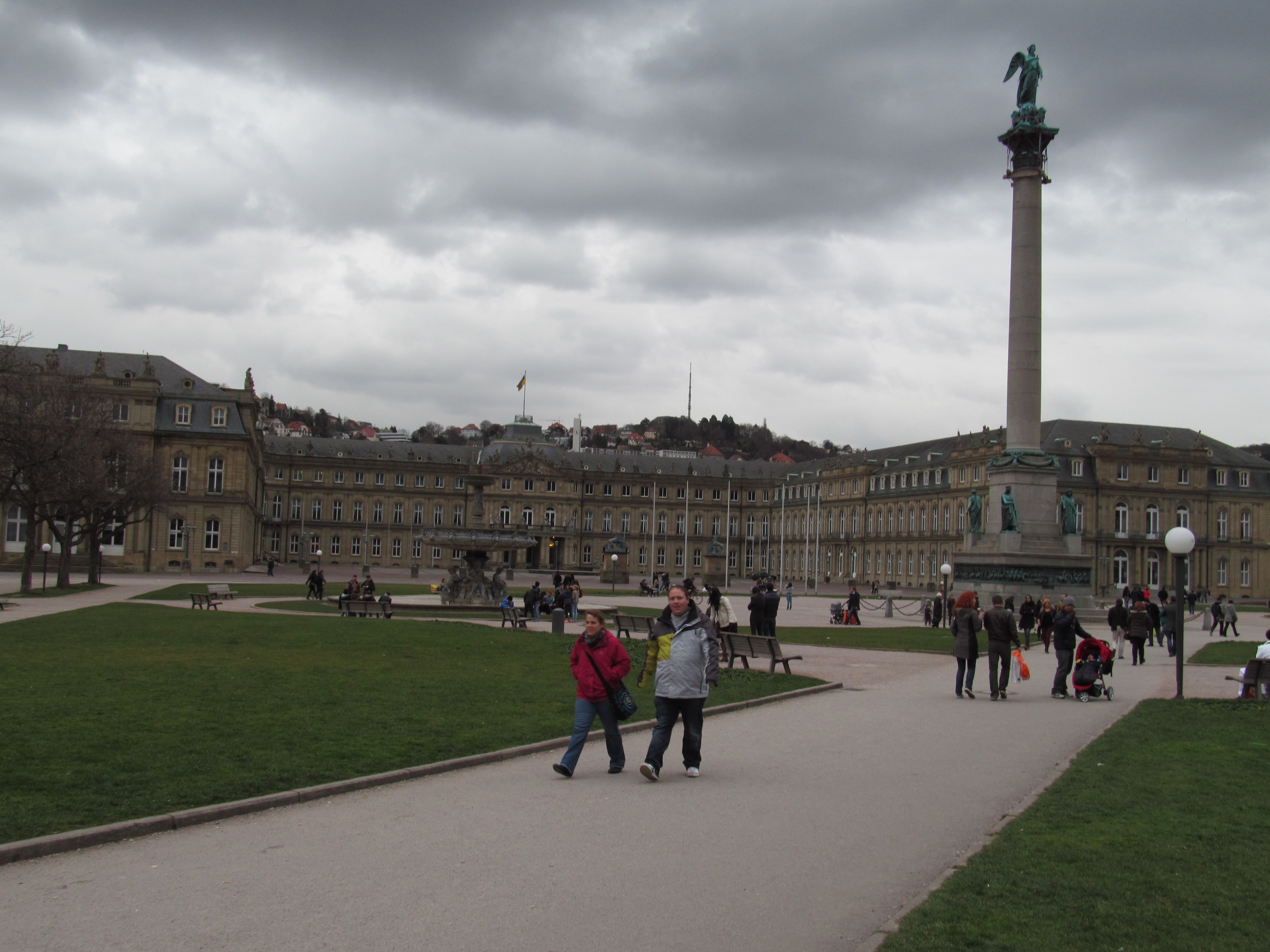
Neues Schloss, Schlossplatz, Stuttgart, Germany

Schlossplatz (German pronunciation: [ˈʃlɔsˌplats]) is the largest square in Stuttgart Mitte and home to the Neues Schloss which was built between 1746 and 1807. From its construction until the mid-1800s it was used as a military parade ground and not open to general public use. It stands next to two other popular squares in Stuttgart: Karlsplatz to the south and Schillerplatz to the south west. The Königstraße (King Street) bisects the plaza from north to south.

The Neues Schloss Palace and grounds have been public property since 1918.

Along with much of Stuttgart Mitte, Neues Schloss was heavily damaged during the Allied Bombing of World War II and the building was restored from 1958–1964 with a modernized interior that houses the ministries of Culture and the Treasury for the government of Baden-Württemberg.

Until the 1960s the King Street that bisects the plaza carried auto and truck traffic. Since that time the Stuttgart underground has built an underground station and tunnels were built to redirect traffic away from the plaza and Königstraße.

The entire square was last fully renovated in 1977 to mark the staging of the Bundesgartenschau (Federal Garden Show) in Stuttgart. The lawns and flowerbeds were renewed in 2006 following the staging of the 2006 World Cup Finals.

== Transport ==
- Schlossplatz lies almost directly on the B27 road.
- Bus routes 42 and 44, all 17 night buses, the U5, U6, U7, U12 and U15 lines of the Stuttgart underground stop directly on Schlossplatz.

== Events ==
Every year Schlossplatz is home to major outdoor events such as open-air concerts, children's fairs and parts of the Weihnachten market including an outdoor ice rink. During the 2006 World Cup Finals the square regularly held more than 40,000 spectators who watched live matches on 3 huge screens.

Schlossplatz featured the United Buddy Bears exhibition in summer 2008 - an array of 144 two metre-high sculptures, each designed by a different artist, touring the world as a symbol of cultural understanding, tolerance and mutual trust.

== Other images ==
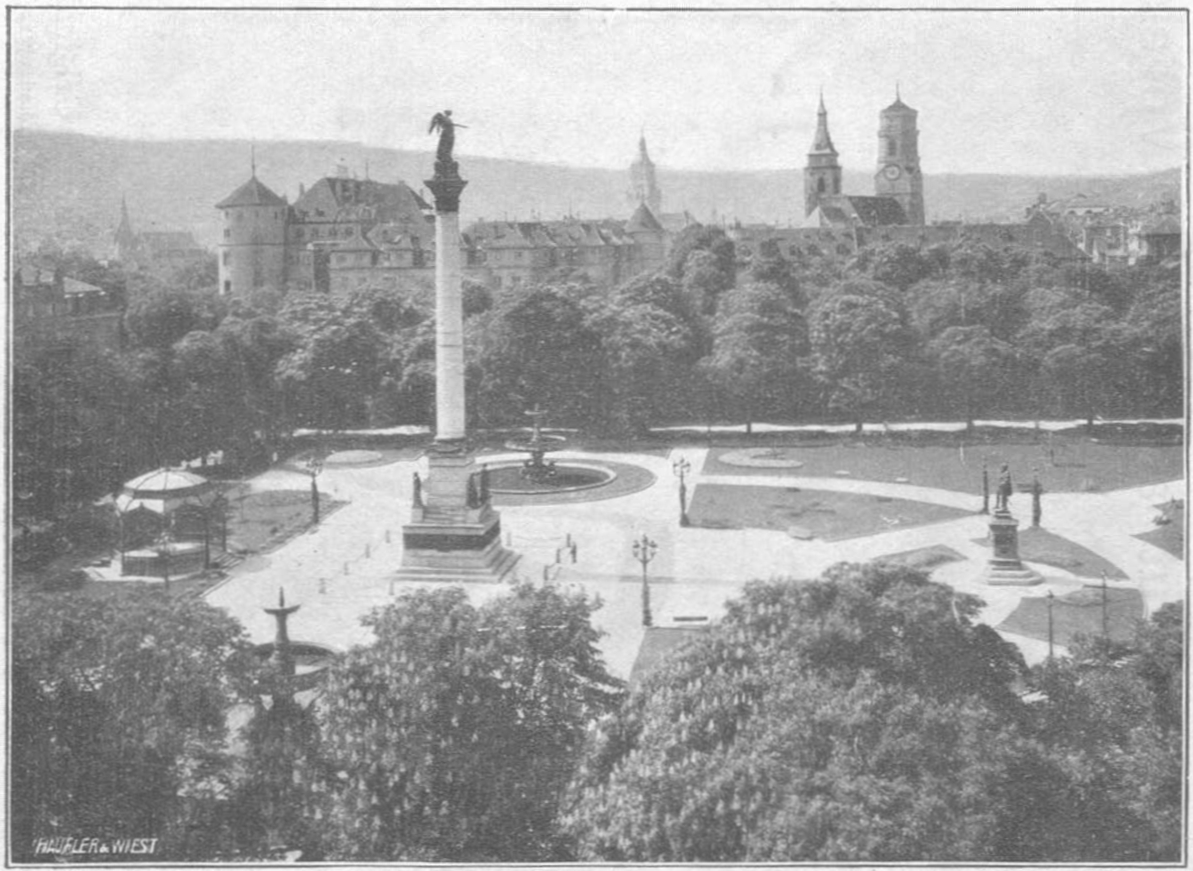
1915 Image of Schlossplatz

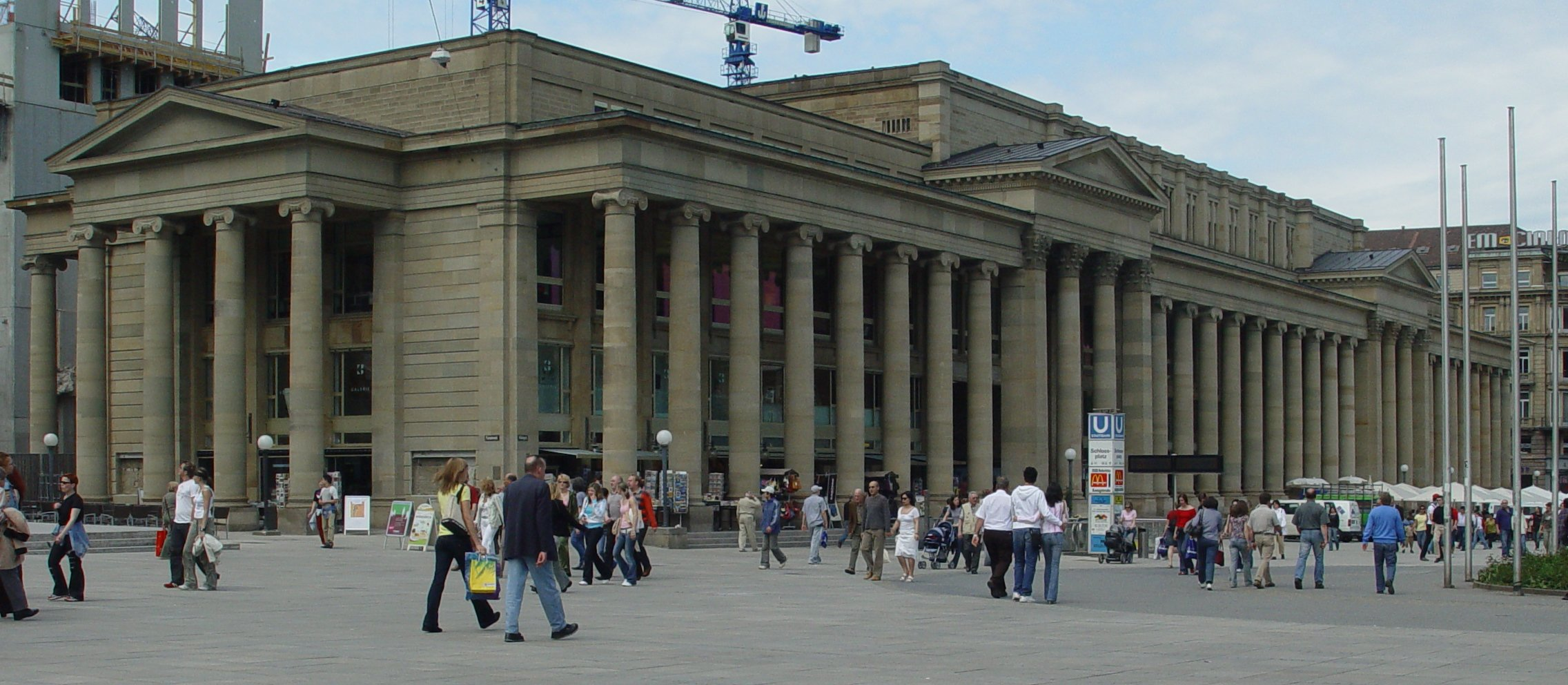
The Königsbau, home to the local stock exchange from 1991 to 2002

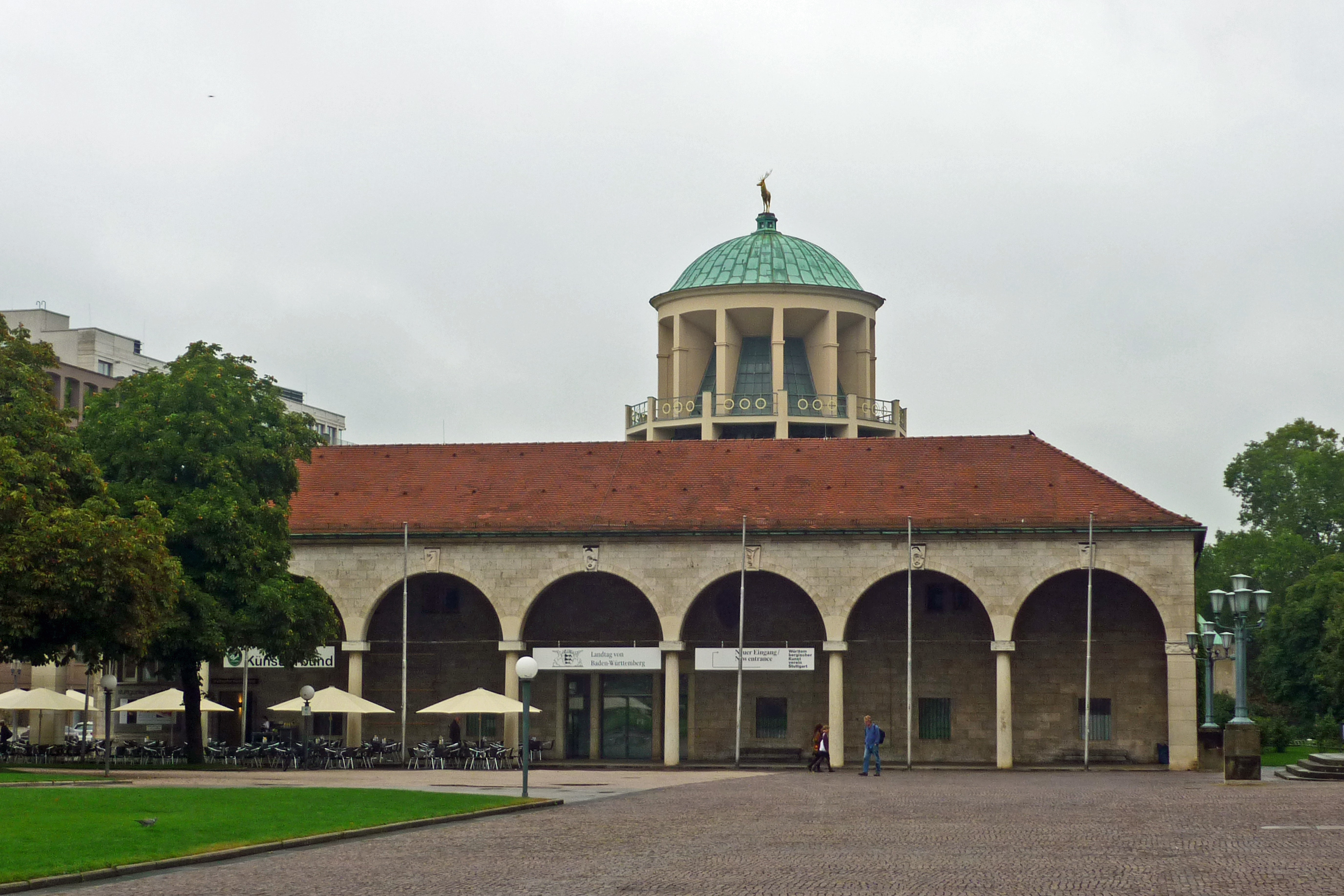
The centre of arts

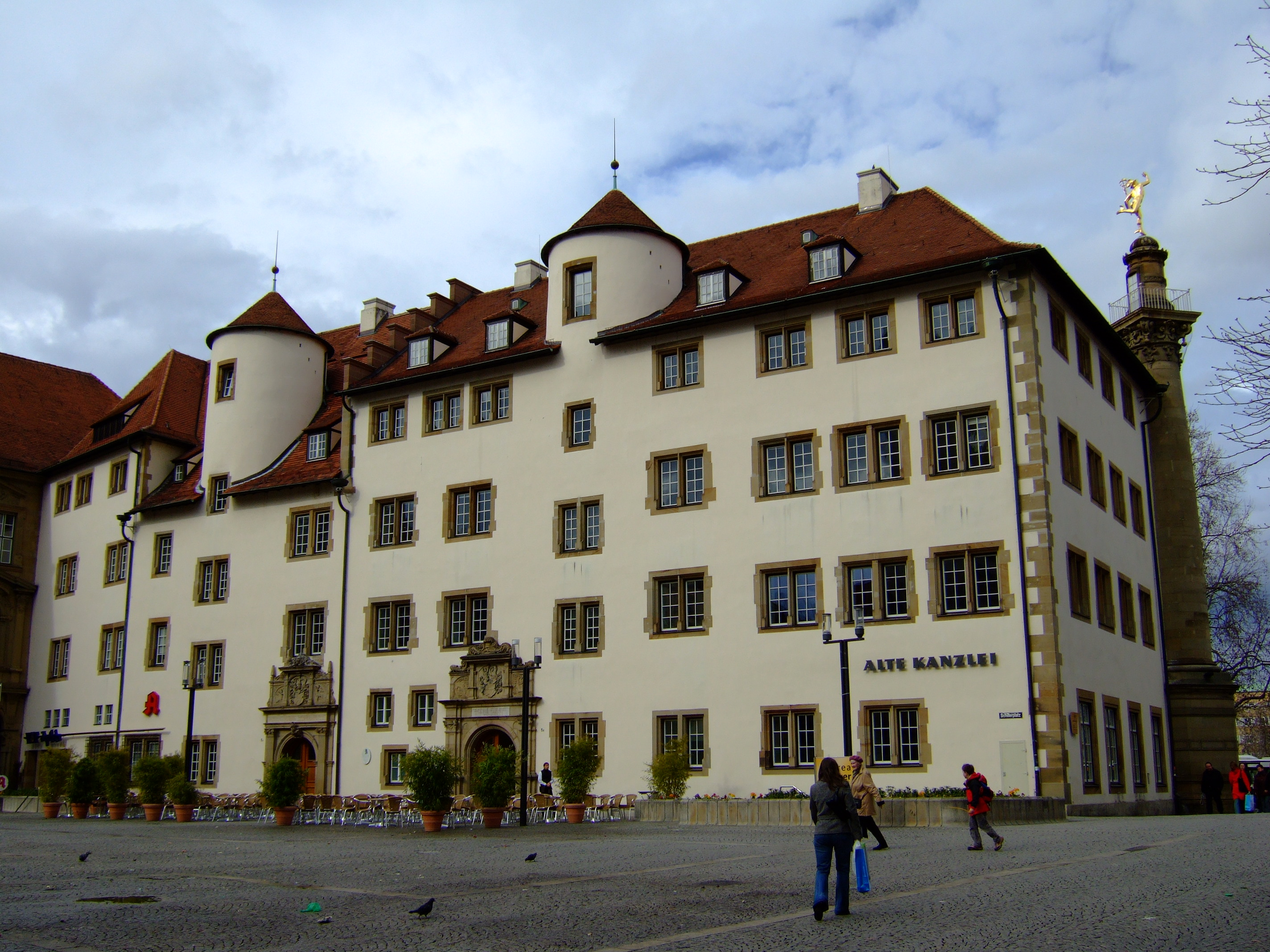
The Alte Kanzlei (Old chancellery), viewed from neighbouring Schillerplatz

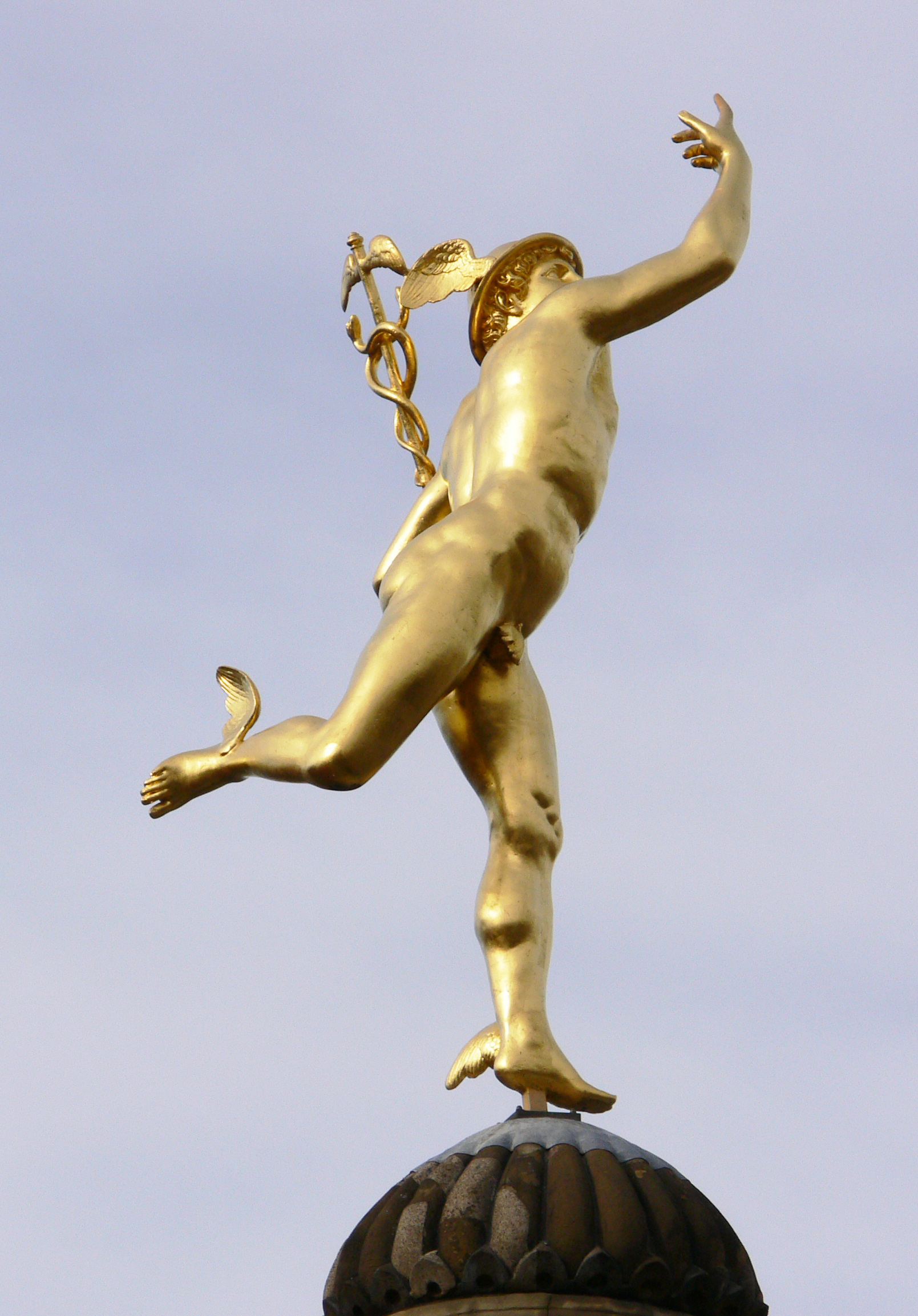
The Mercury Pillar, completed in 1598

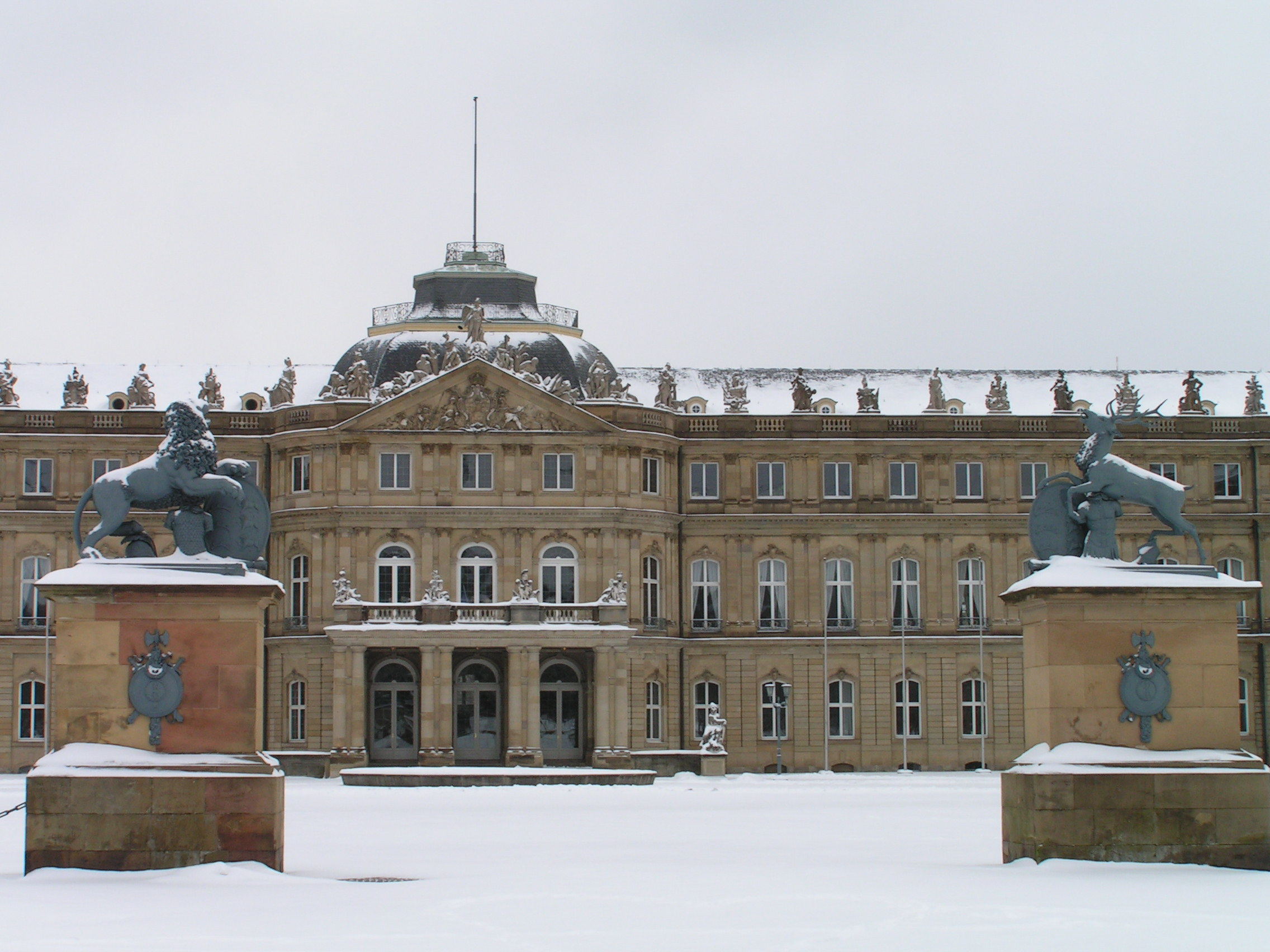
Entrance to the Neues Schloss from Schlossplatz

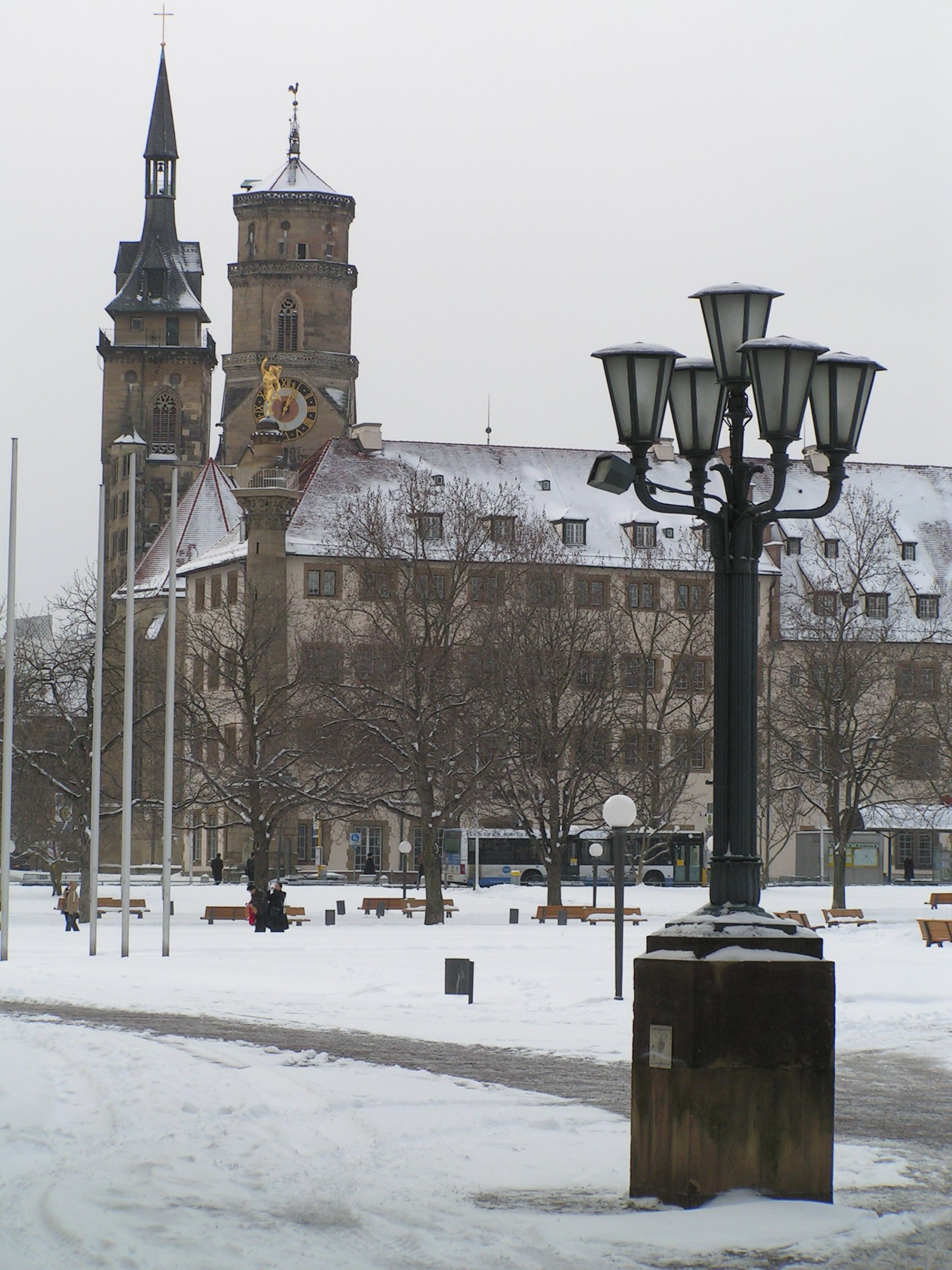
The West side of Schlossplatz looking towards the Alte Kanzlei and Schillerplatz

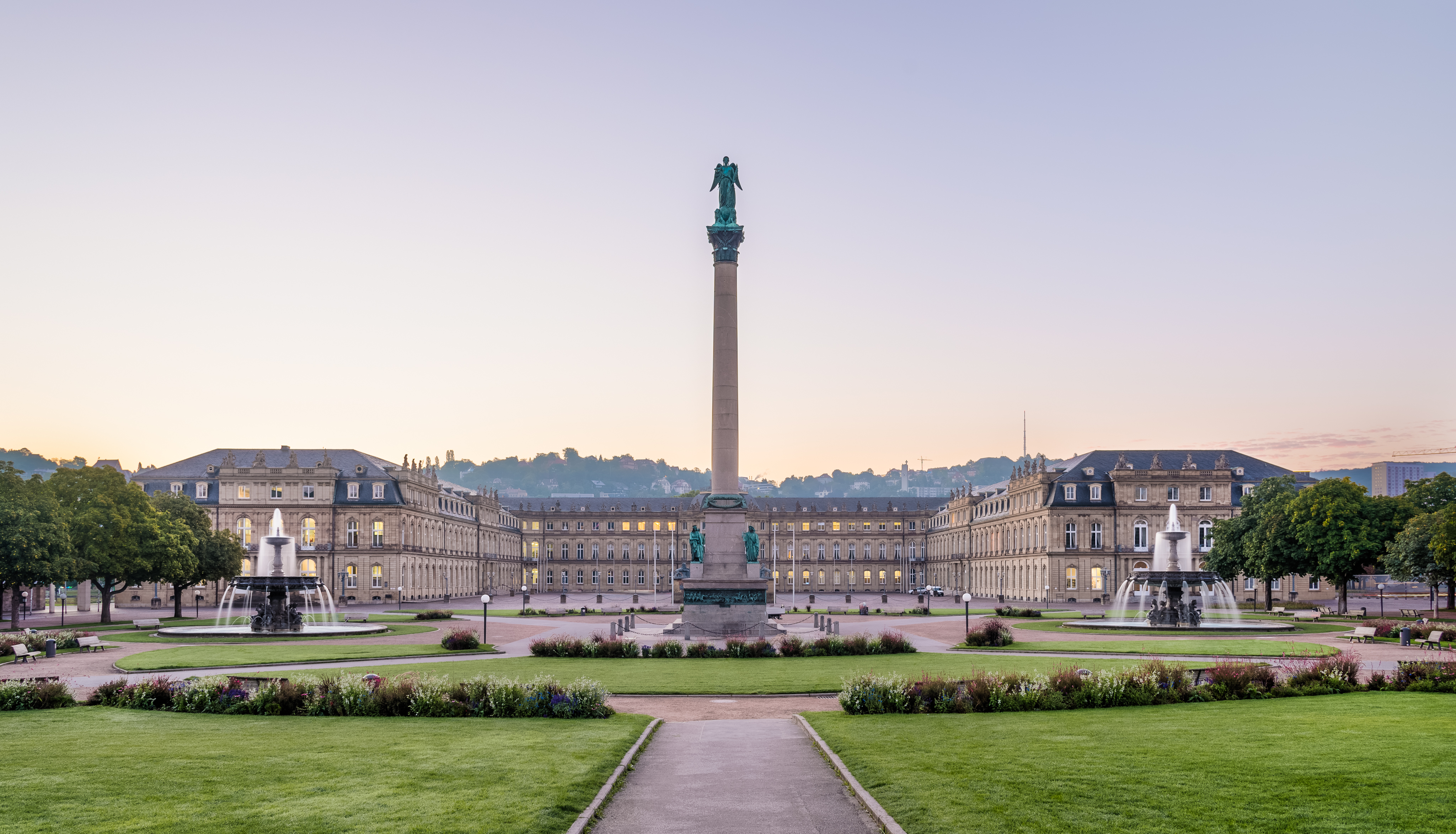
Schlossplatz at dawn with the Jubiläumssäule in front of the New Castle

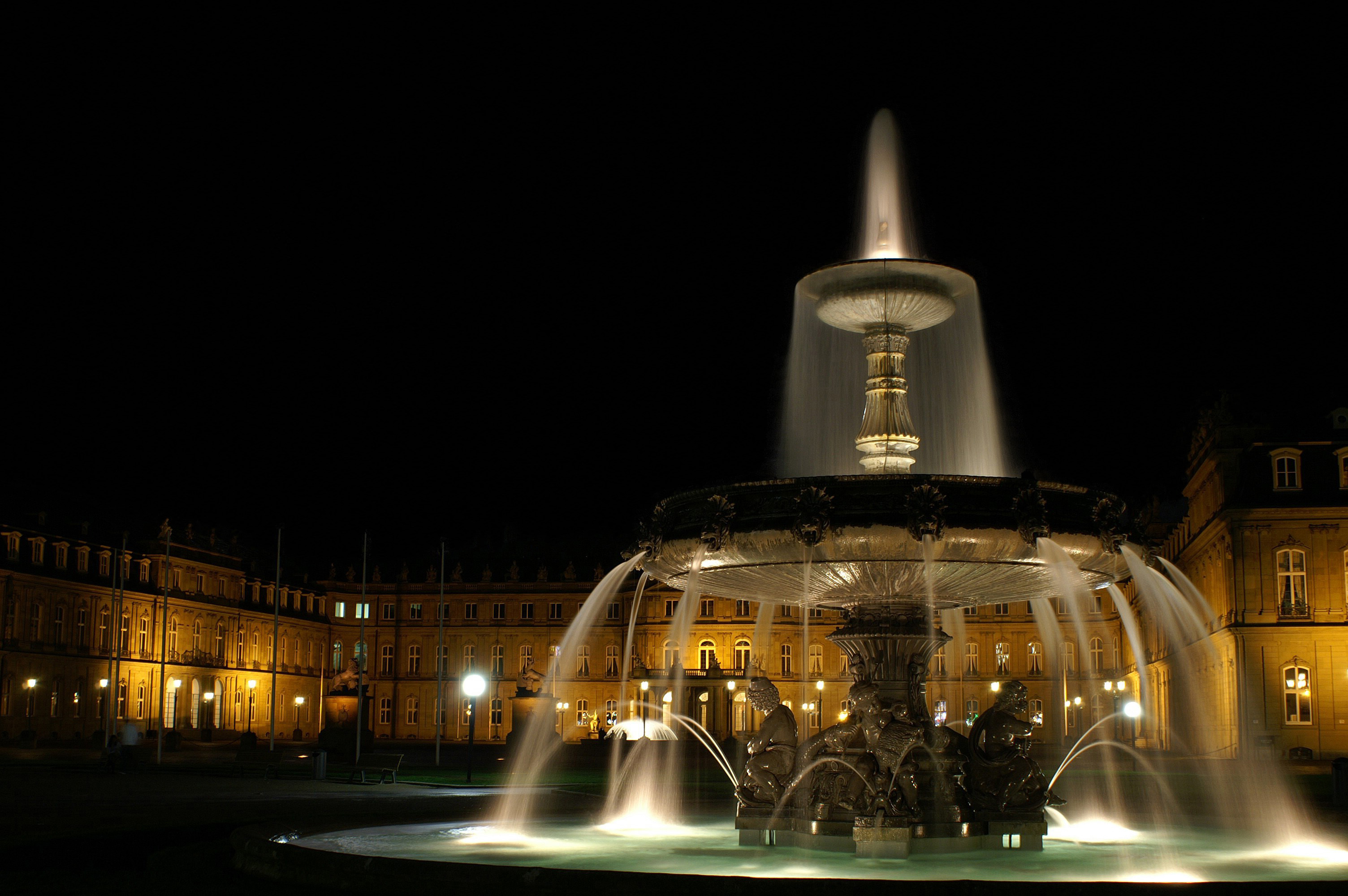
Neues Schloss at night

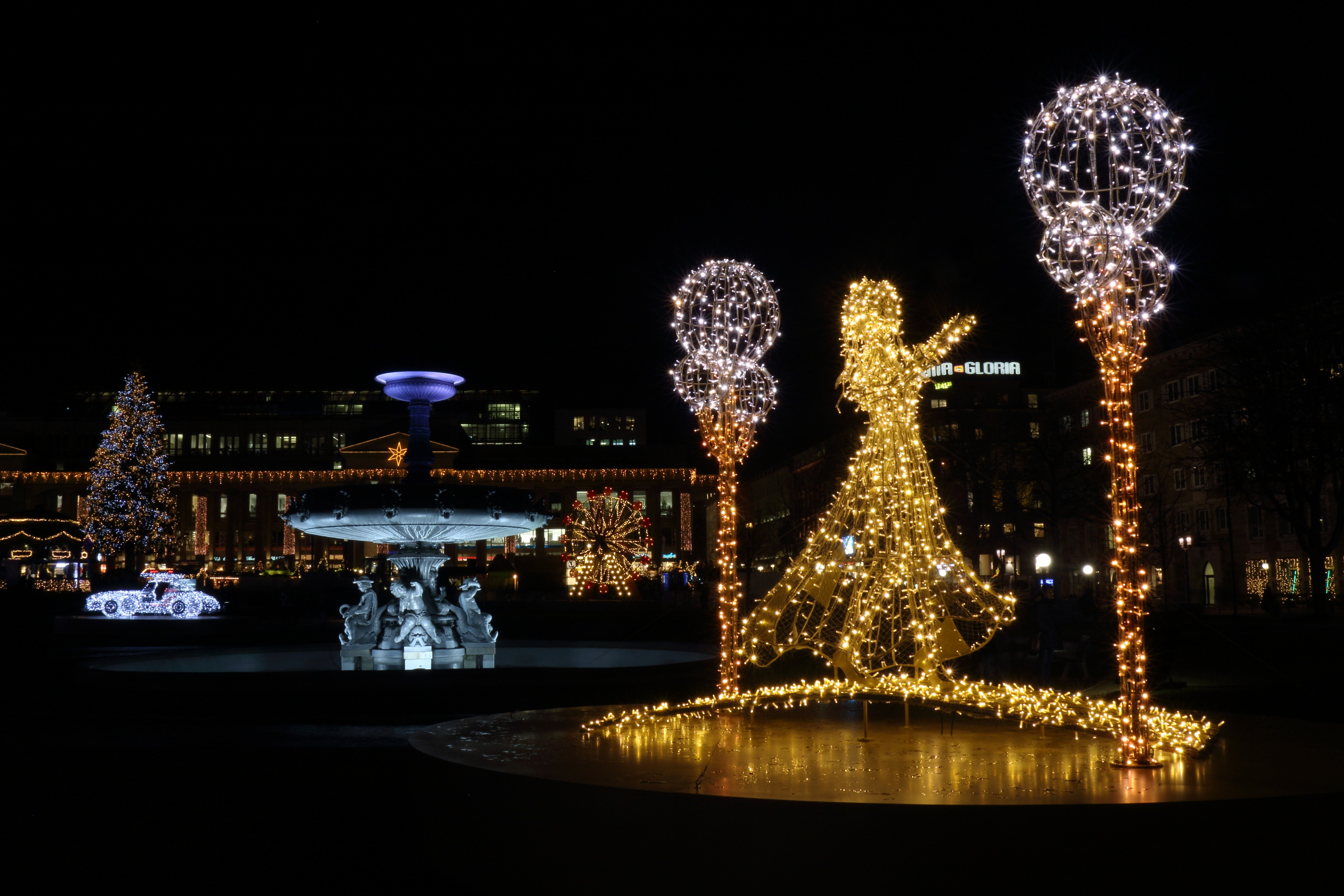
Light illumination during Christmas season

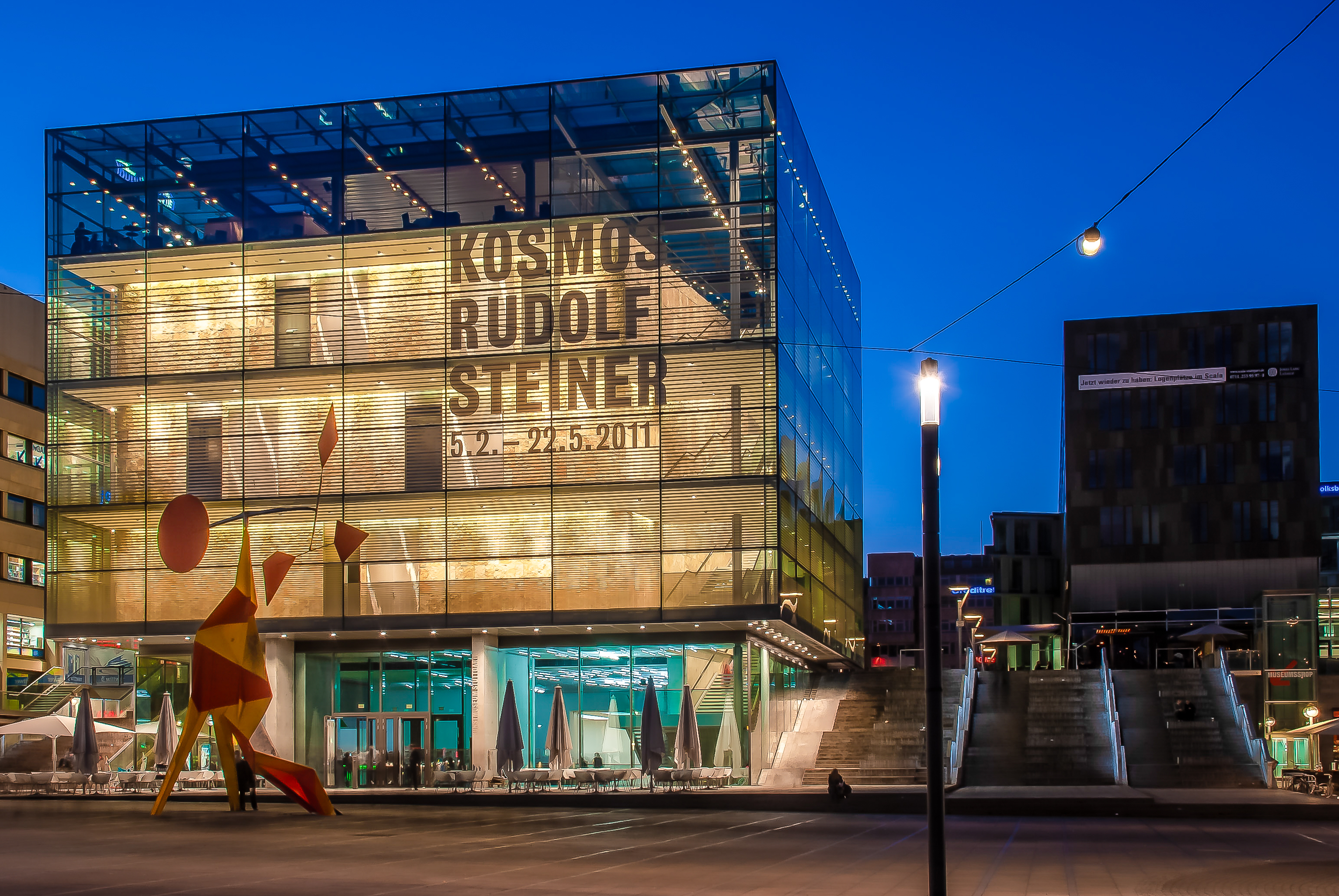
Kunstmuseum

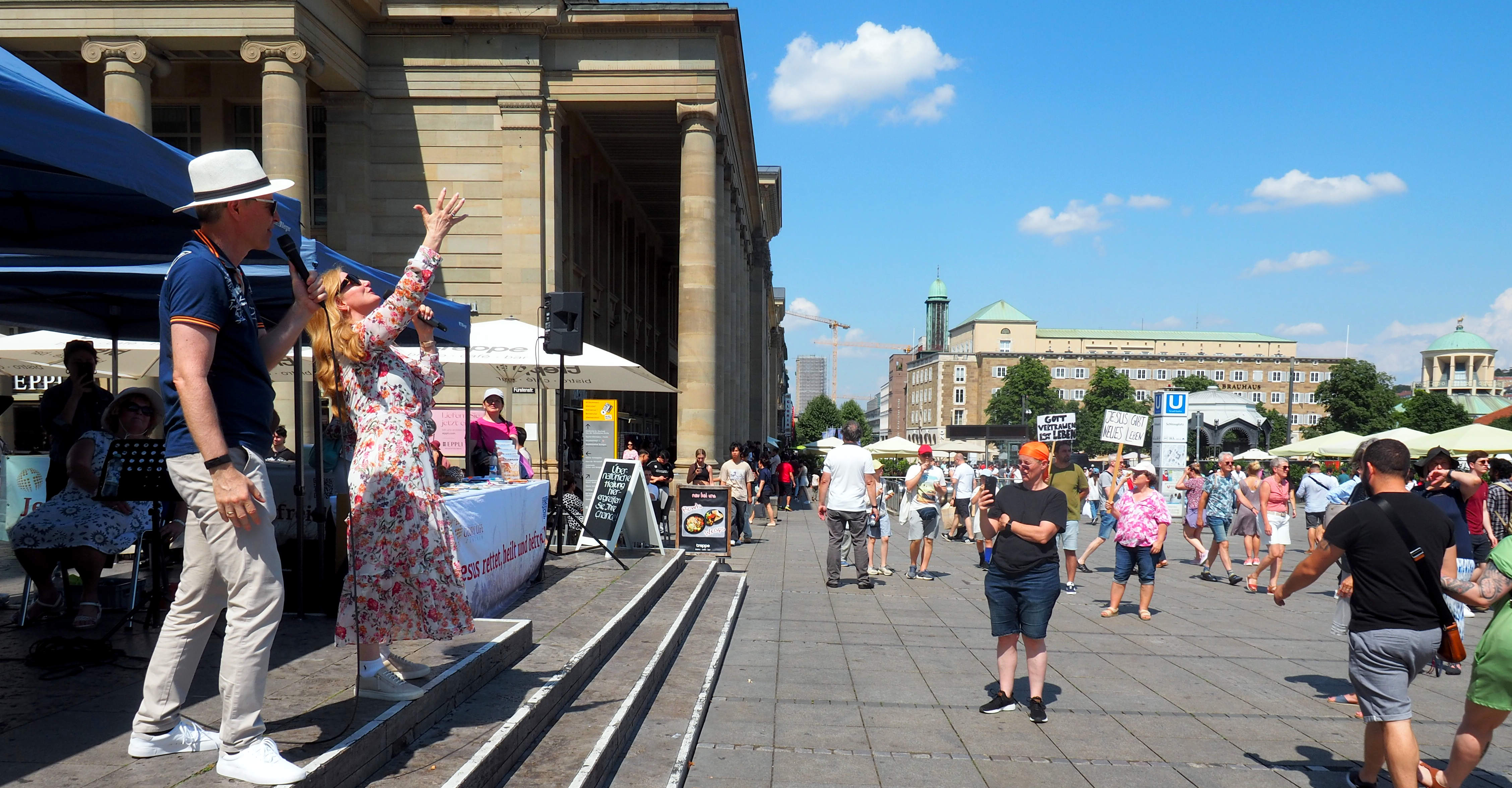
View from Kunstmuseum along Königsbau to the north side

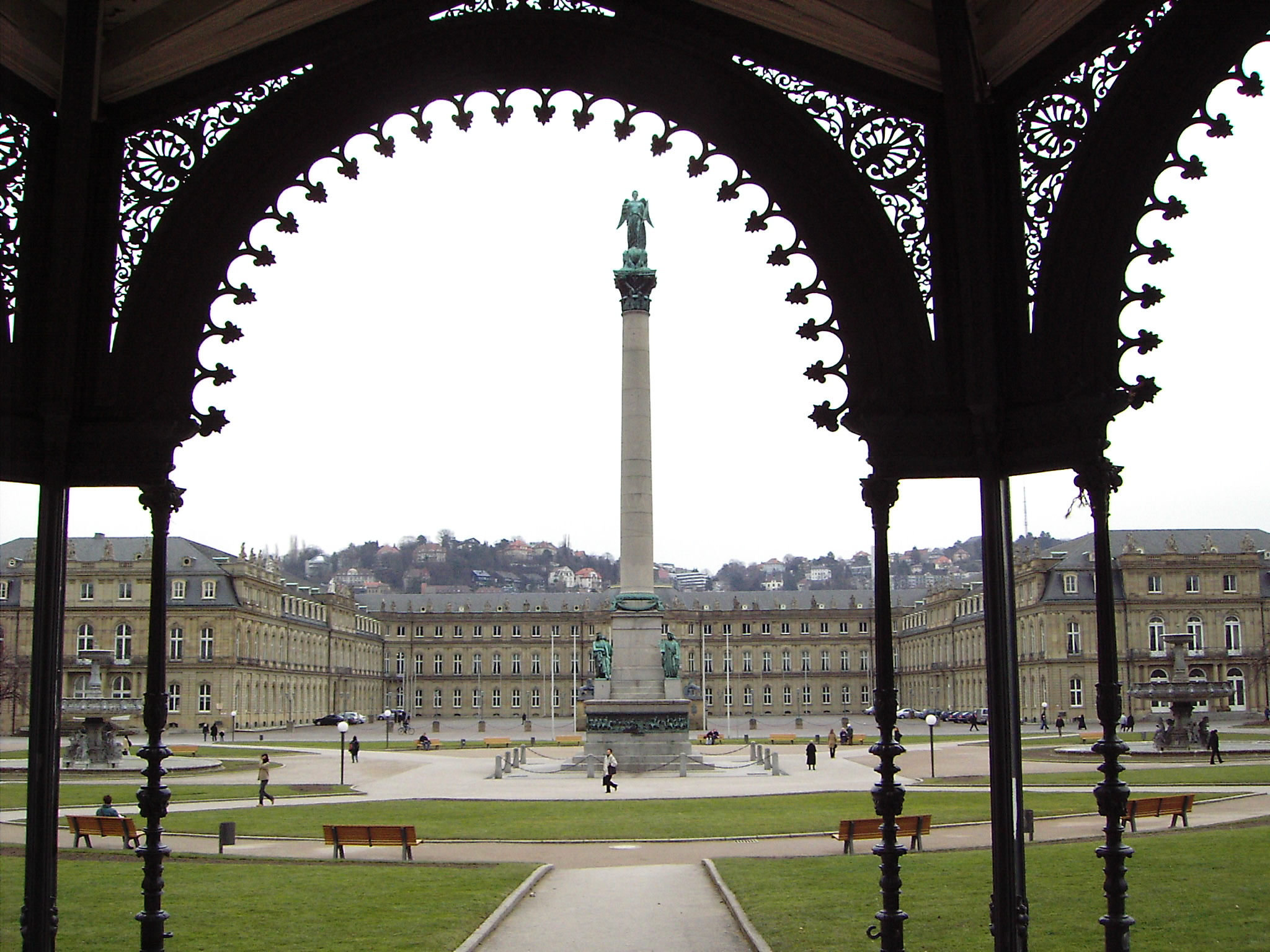
The bandstand looking towards the New Castle

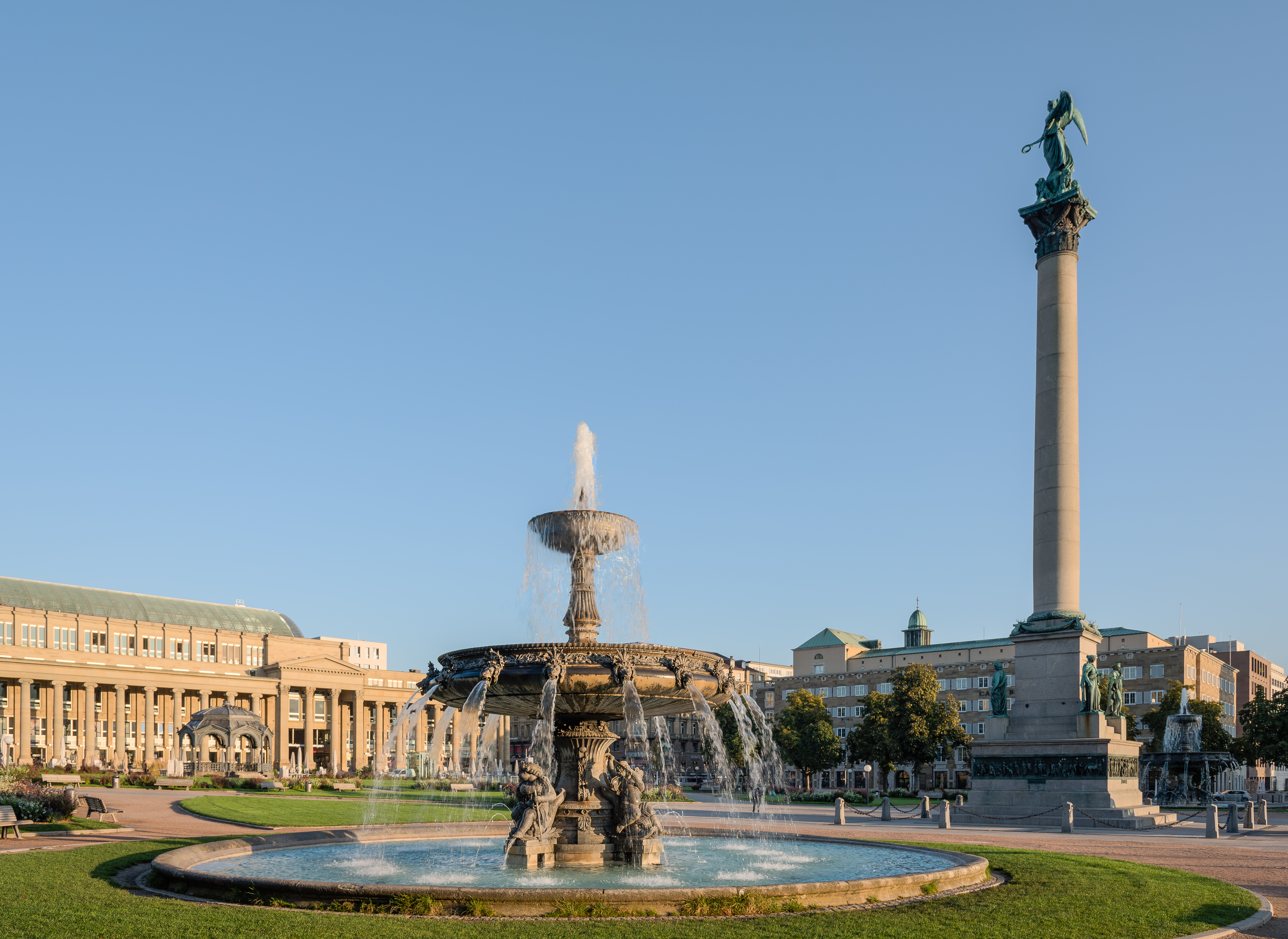
Fountain on Schlossplatz with the Königsbau in the background

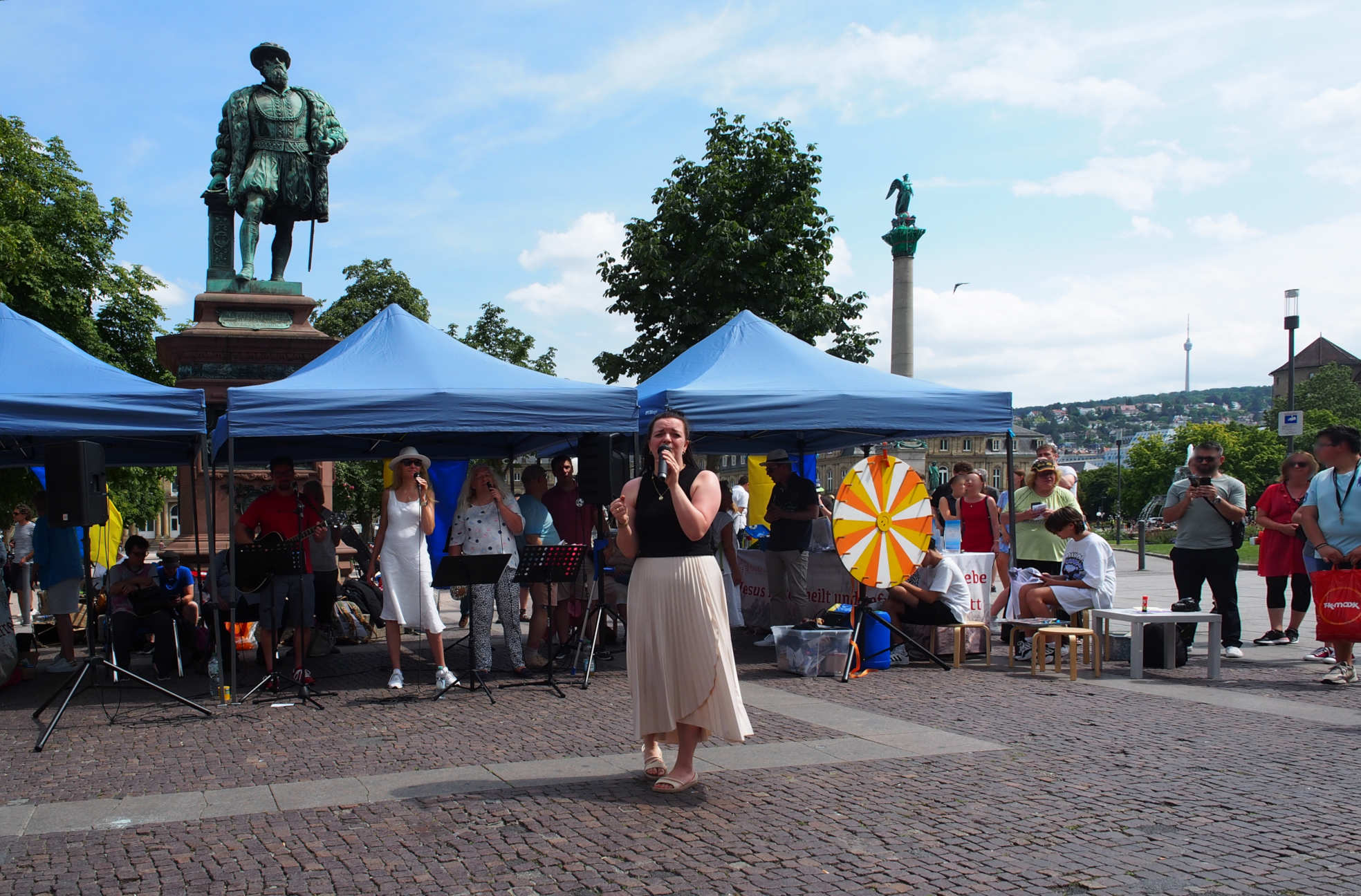
Public events of all types and sizes take place on Schlossplatz.

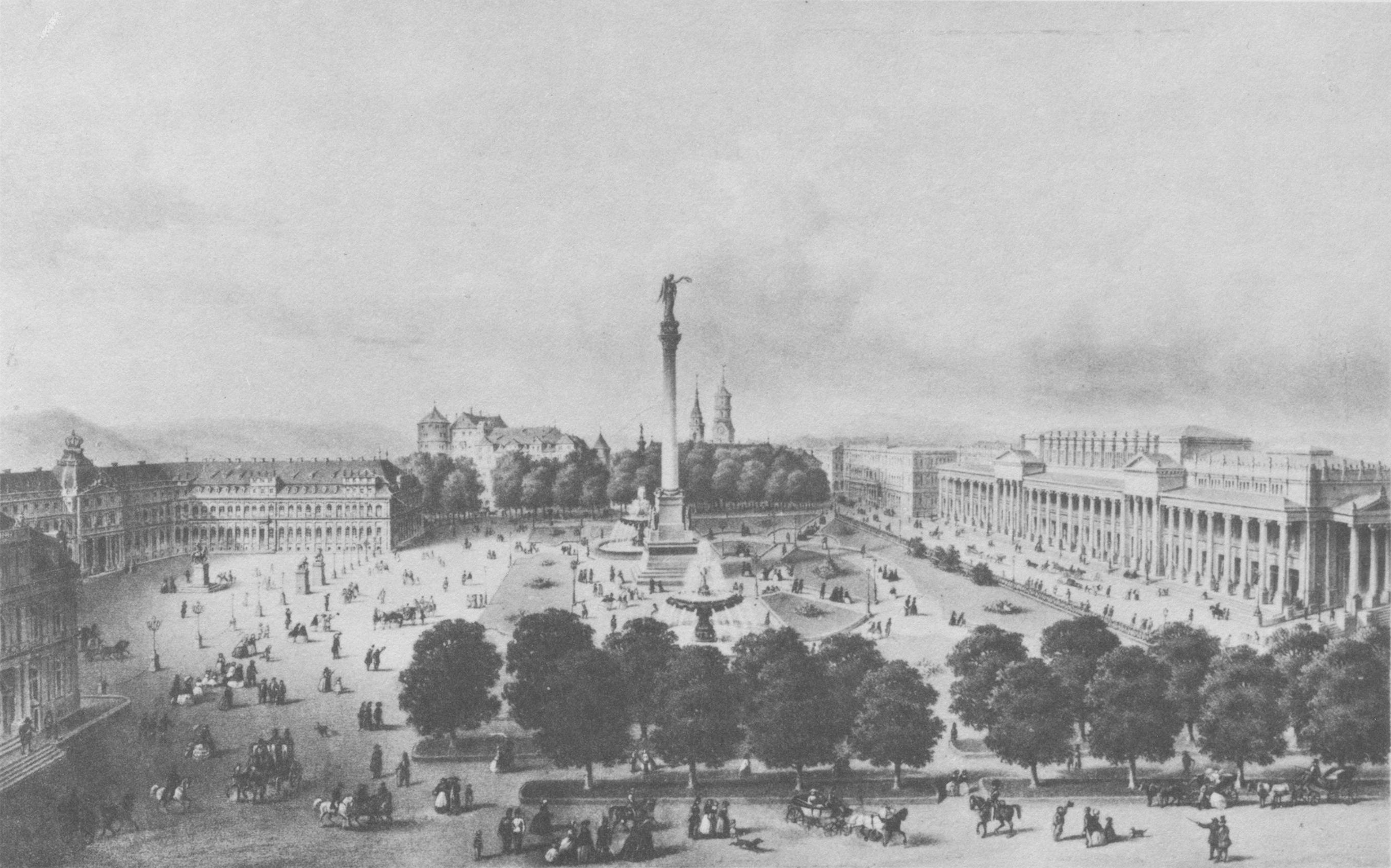
1863 lithograph of Schlossplatz
