= Adalbert II (bishop of Worms) =

Bishop of Worms from 1070 to 1107 during the Holy Roman Empire

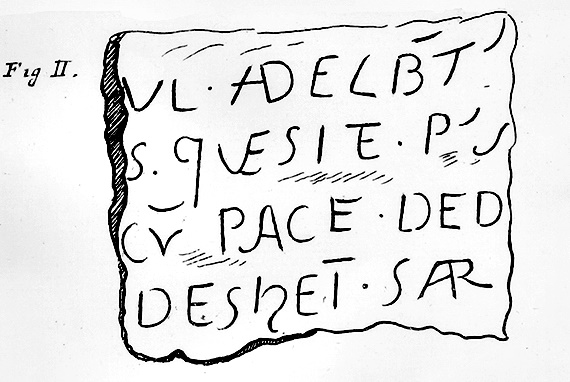
Drawing of a grave slab fragment of Bishop Adalbert II, preserved by Johann Friedrich Schannat († 1739), in the Church of St. Cyriacus, Worms-Neuhausen. Remaining inscription: [PRAES]VL · ADELB(ER)T(VS) [CHRISTI MEMOR ET BENE CERTVS] /[MESSI]S · QVESITE · P(OST) [HVIVS SEMINA VITAE] /[PRAEDIA] CV(M) PACE · DED[IT ISTA TIBI CYRIACE] /[BOL]DESHEIM · SAR[LESHEIM] /WARMANDESHEIM ("Bishop Adalbert, mindful of Christ and certain of the harvest after the sowing of this life, gave you, Cyriacus, these estates in peace: Boldesheim, Sarlesheim, Warmundesheim.")

Adalbert II (c. 1035 – 6 July 1107) was the Prince-Bishop of Worms from 1070 until his death. A significant ecclesiastical figure during the Investiture Controversy, he is also remembered for his attempt to protect the Jewish community of Worms during the Rhineland massacres of 1096.

== Origin and family ==
Adalbert II succeeded Bishop Adalbert I in 1070. Earlier sources placed his origin in Saxony, but recent scholarship identifies him as a member of the Rhenish noble family of the Counts of Idstein-Eppstein. His brother is believed to have been Count Udalrich of Idstein, the presumed founder of Burg Idstein. He was also related to Archbishops Siegfried I and Adalbert I of Saarbrücken.

== Episcopal career ==
Initially in good standing with Henry IV, Adalbert was documented at the royal court in 1071. However, he joined the princely opposition, and when Henry attempted to enter Worms in late 1073, Adalbert refused him entry. Citizens of Worms, persuaded by the king, expelled the bishop and received Henry with honors. Henry placed the bishopric under royal control until, after his excommunication, he was compelled at the Diet of Trebur in 1076 to reinstate Adalbert. He returned for only six months before being driven out again.

In 1078, Adalbert supported the anti-king Rudolf of Rheinfelden at the Battle of Mellrichstadt, where he was captured and imprisoned for three years.

Adalbert returned to Worms in 1105 after Henry IV's deposition by his son Henry V. He witnessed the abdication at Ingelheim on 31 December 1105. In the two remaining years of his episcopate, Adalbert worked to restore the bishopric and city. During his exile, three anti-bishops appointed by Henry IV had held the see: Thietmar (1085), Ebbo (1090–1099), and Conrad (1099–1101).

== Church reform and religious contributions ==
Adalbert was a staunch supporter of Pope Gregory VII. Joseph Hirschel wrote of him in Wetzer and Welte's Kirchenlexikon: "Adalbert appears in this troubled time as a pillar and ornament of the German Church."

Despite his absences, Adalbert continued performing sacred duties. In 1100, he consecrated the crypt of the Church of St. Martin in Sindelfingen alongside Bishop Gebhard III of Constance.

On 7 February 1083, he consecrated the chapel of Wirtemberg Castle near Stuttgart to Nicholas of Myra. The chapel's dedication stone survives in the Württemberg Mausoleum, marking the earliest documented link to the House of Württemberg.

In 1106, Adalbert issued a charter to Worms' fishermen, founding what is believed to be the oldest documented fishermen's guild in Germany, still commemorated by the Wormser Backfischfest.

== Role during the Worms Massacre ==
In May 1096, during the People's Crusade, crusaders attacked Jewish communities throughout the Rhineland. In Worms, Bishop Adalbert II offered shelter to between 800 and 1,000 Jews in his palace. After eight days of siege, the crusaders breached the palace and massacred the Jews at prayer. Only a few survived through suicide or forced baptism.

== Death and burial ==
Adalbert died on 6 July 1107 and was buried at the St. Cyriacus Monastery in Worms-Neuhausen, which he had endowed with estates. The bishopric remained vacant for seven years. Burchard II was appointed his successor in 1115.

Preceded by Adalbert I of Worms	Bishop of Worms; 1070–1107	Succeeded by Burchard II of Worms
