= Württemberg (hill) =

Hill in Stuttgart, Baden-Württemberg, Germany

Coordinates: 48.7821°N 9.26867°E

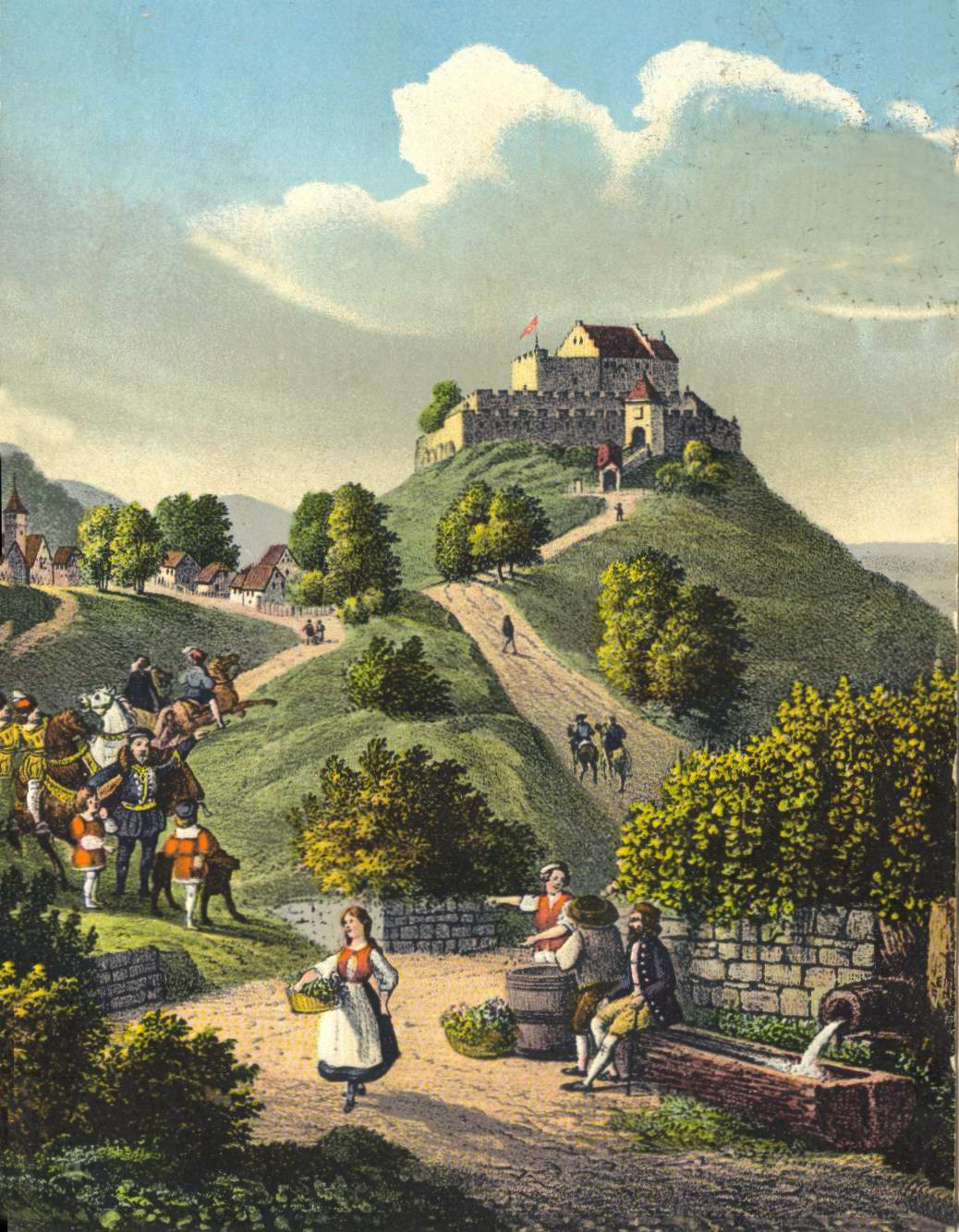
The medieval Württemberg Castle on the hill, in a 1700s print

The Württemberg (German pronunciation: [ˈvʏʁtəmbɛʁk]; official name until 1907: Rotenberg) is a hill on the territory of the German city of Stuttgart, capital of Baden-Württemberg. Its peak lies above vineyards at 411 m above sea level, on the eastern edge of the Stuttgart cauldron valley, in the Rotenberg quarter of Stuttgart's district of Untertürkheim, overlooking the Neckar valley with the Daimler-Benz industrial plant and the Mercedes-Museum.

The name of the hill is probably derived from Wirdeberg, a hill in Luxembourg, the possible origin of the Württemberg family. Other theories claim it came from Celto-Romanic sources (Wirodunum). It is homonymous to the name of the area and historic territory of Württemberg, which is now a part of the state of Baden-Württemberg.

In 1083, Burg Wirtemberg was erected on the hill, family seat of the rulers of Württemberg. In 1824, Württemberg Mausoleum was built on the site of the former castle by King Wilhelm I of Württemberg for his second wife, Catherine Pavlovna of Russia, who had died in 1819 at the early age of 30. The architect was Giovanni Salucci. The hill was renamed Württemberg from Rotenberg in 1907 by Wilhelm II, the last King of Württemberg.
