= Stadtbibliothek Stuttgart =

Public library

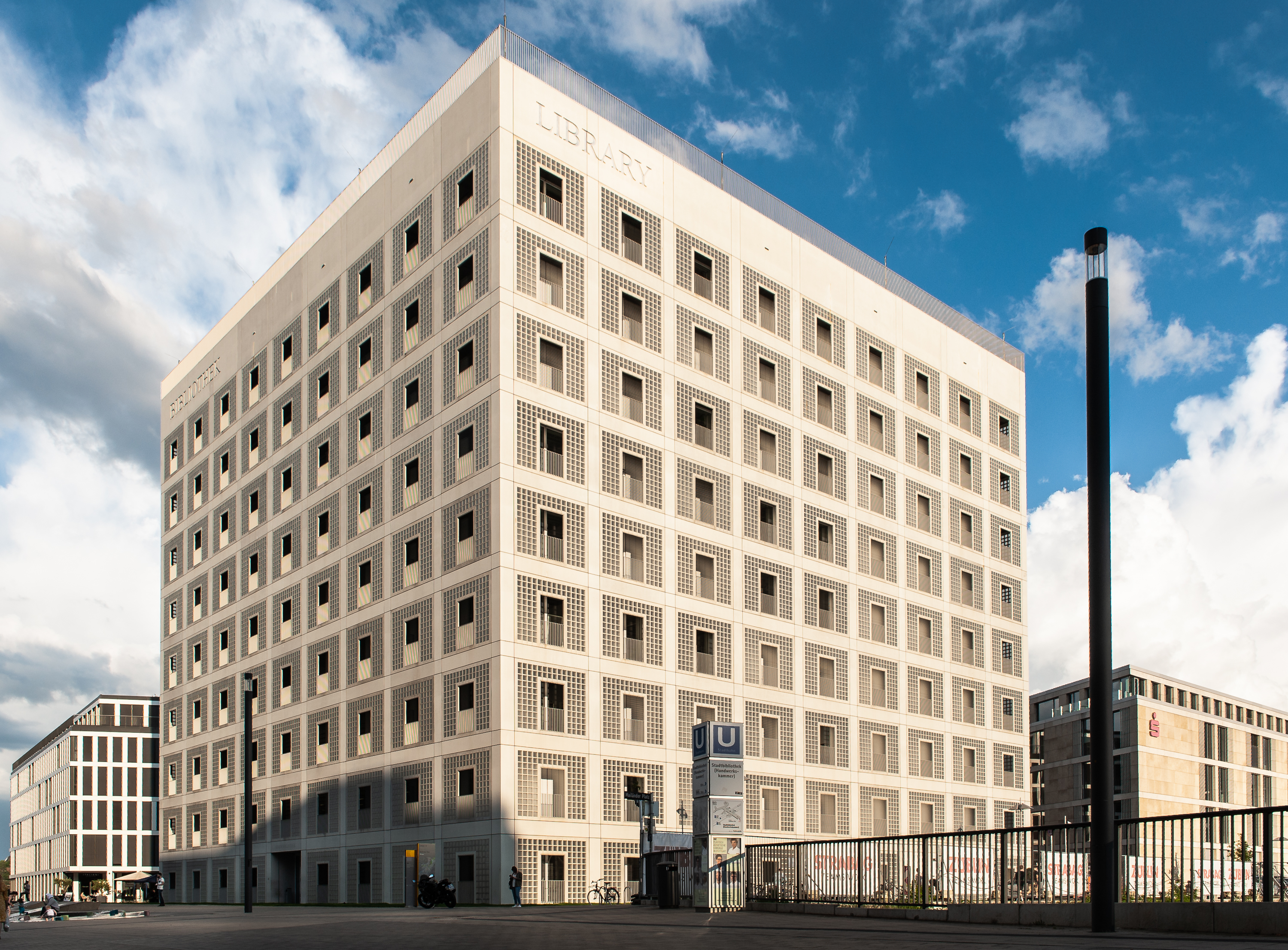
- Stadtbibliothek am Mailänder Platz
- 48°47′25″N 9°10′59″E
- Location: Stuttgart, Germany
- Type: Public library
- Established: 1901

The Stadtbibliothek Stuttgart (formerly Stadtbücherei Stuttgart) is the public library of the city of Stuttgart. It is organized as a department of the city's cultural office and comprises the central library, 17 city district libraries, and two bookmobiles. In 2013, it received the national award as Library of the Year.

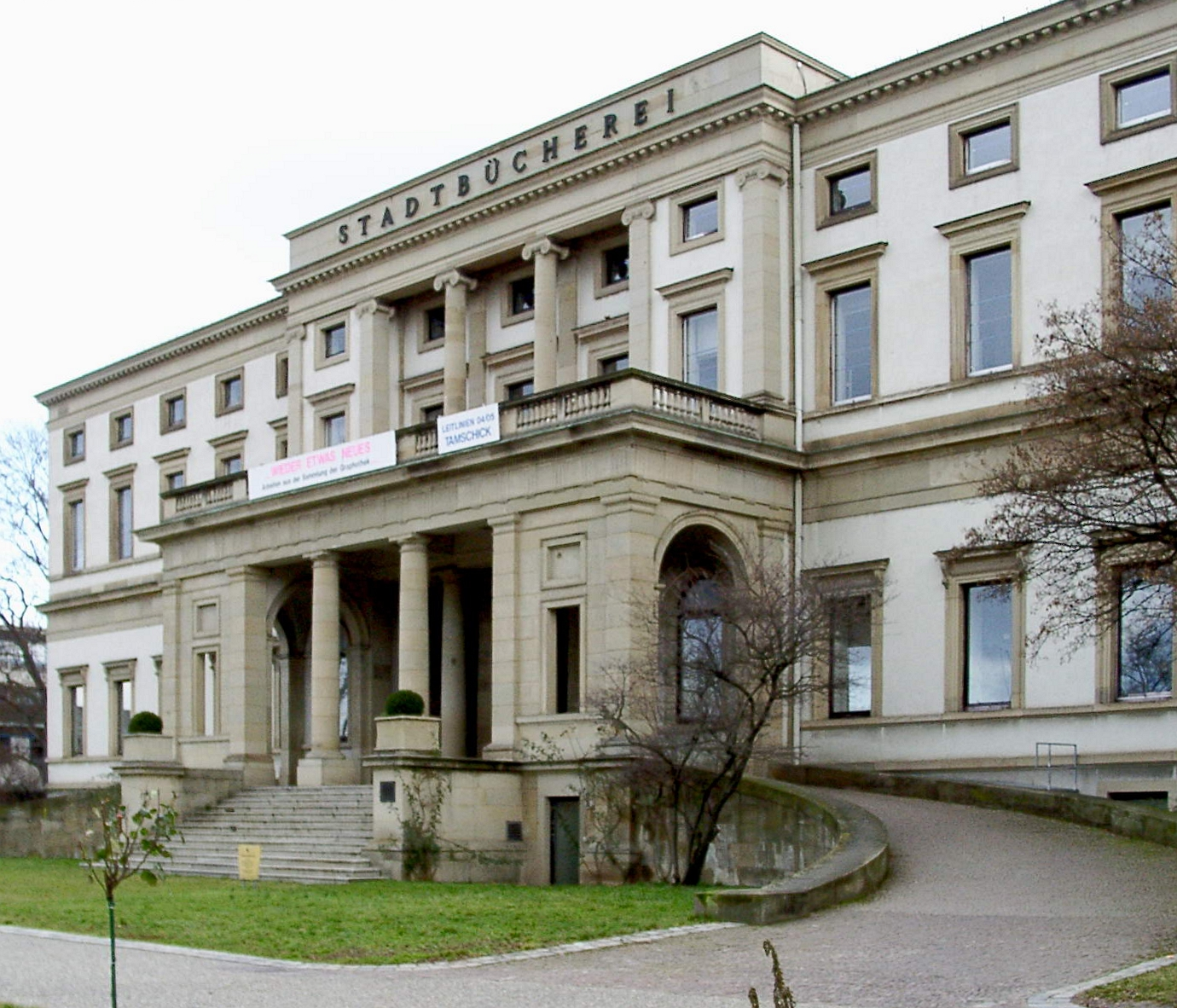
Wilhelm Palais (2008)

From 1965 to 2011, the central library was located in the Wilhelmspalais, built 1834 – 1840 by Giovanni Salucci as the residence of the Württemberg king. In 2011, it was moved to the newly built Stadtbibliothek am Mailänder Platz.

== City Library of the Mailänder Platz ==
The new library of Stuttgart is a monolithic cube which gathers all the ancient libraries in one building. This building is the outcome of an international competition won by Eun Young Yi in 1999. Part of the Masterplan from Stuttgart 21, the building has become a new landmark for the city and the Europaviertel. The construction of the library started in 2010 and ended 24 October 2011. Its cost amounted to about 80 million euros which included 4 million euros for the interior spaces. The library welcomes almost 2 million visitors each year.

=== Architecture ===
Eun Young Yi designed the new library as a simple cube shape with two floors underground and nine above ground. The basic form of the library is a square. The length is 44 meters and the height 40 meters. The square prism is a structured building consisting of a precast concrete framework with glass bricks elements set within. The monolith intends to create a new feature that will function as a calming point for the entire area, creating visual and spatial orientation.

==== The idea ====
The New Library intends to merge tradition and innovation. It is also a building which combines respective age and avant-garde. For Eun Young Yi, it showcases the essential values of architecture and human dignity today. These are for him a reinterpretation of the final product: a static monolith. Following Eun Youg Yi design, the building, with its section, symbolizes the veiling of man. The layering and the secrets values are more important from the outside to the inside.

==== Architecture design ====
The entrances of the building are on all four sides of the cube. The house consists of four types of rooms, lined up layer by layer like onion skins. The glass block facade forms the outer layer. Behind it lies the glass interior façade. In the gaps between the layers, you can find the accesses. As for the inner staircase and the outer corridors and balconies, it uses a strolling walkway design.

To provide a meditative space in the busy city centre, the brief required the designer to focus on "centredness". The central element inside the building is the so-called "heart" of the library. It is an archaic central space that extends over four floors and does not have any specific library functions.

As sources of inspiration, Yi Architects relied upon the design of the Pantheon, the 1785 Bibliothèque Nationale de France proposal, Noah's ark, and A Space Odyssey by Stanley Kubrick.

The building typology of the Roman Pantheon is the base for the high cube-shaped. Lightened by a central skylight, it gives it its meditative touch. The library, opened in all directions, has a circular foyer. It gives you a glimpse of the composition of the building. There are a waiting area, an area for reading newspapers and a book sorter for returning media in the entrance hall.

The other central space, the gallery, located above the heart, is derived from a national library for France by Etienne Boullée. It translates into a square shape, for the architect: "A perfect sphere translates into a perfect cube". From the fifth level, a funnel-shaped hall opens upwards and creates large central air spaces. Only books surround the lobby. It has two spiral staircases stretching up to the top. For the architect, it symbolizes the opening to the outside world, to the world of knowledge.

The eighth level houses a small bistro, a literature café, the art collection and the Graphothek. From there, you can access the roof terrace, which offers a 360-degree view of the Stuttgart Valley. Under the so-called "heart" is an event hall that can accommodate about 300 people. The mixture of retreat areas and public areas runs through the entire building as a spatial theme.

A "studiolo" can be found on every floor and is reminiscent of the study room of the Renaissance.

==== The shell ====
The facade of the cubic structure consists of 9x9 glass blocks. The floor plan, view and section always match the grid size of 0.97 meters. The glass block facade consists of segments with window openings. The architect chose deliberately frosted glass blocks to demarcates the world of education. He wanted to feature the culture from the hustle and bustle of the outside world as well. Behind the glass front lies a membrane-like glass skin, a walkable space lies between the two. Functionally, this double facade serves for ventilation. It is also an exciting experience space for visitors who can enjoy the city view from the window openings.

The envelope has different effects depending on the position of the light. The respective elements have a door-like opening for the exchange between inside and outside and natural air conditioning. Both facades are visible from outside
