= Wirtemberg Castle =

Ruined hilltop castle in Stuttgart, Baden-Württemberg, Germany

Castle Wirtemberg
- Burgruine Wirtemberg
- Mount Württemberg; Near Rotenberg (Stuttgart) in Germany
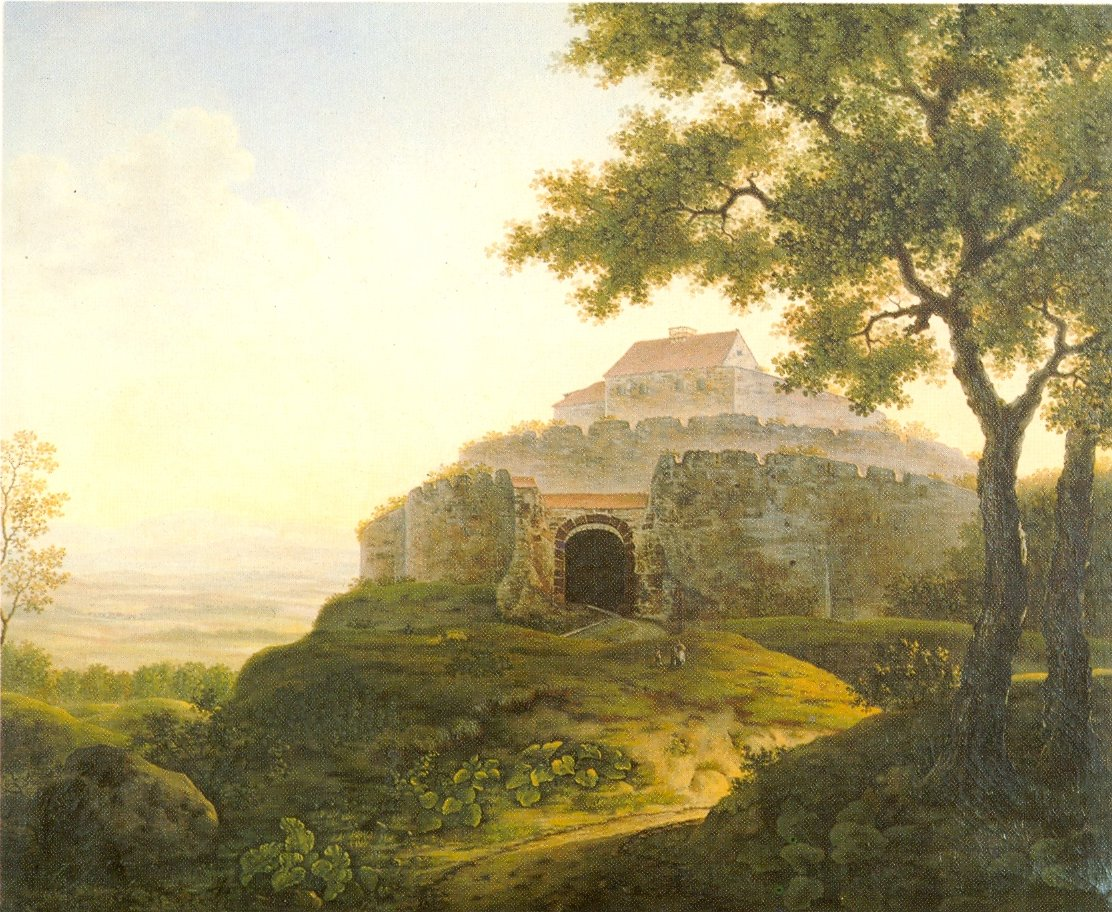
- Wirtemberg Castle before 1819

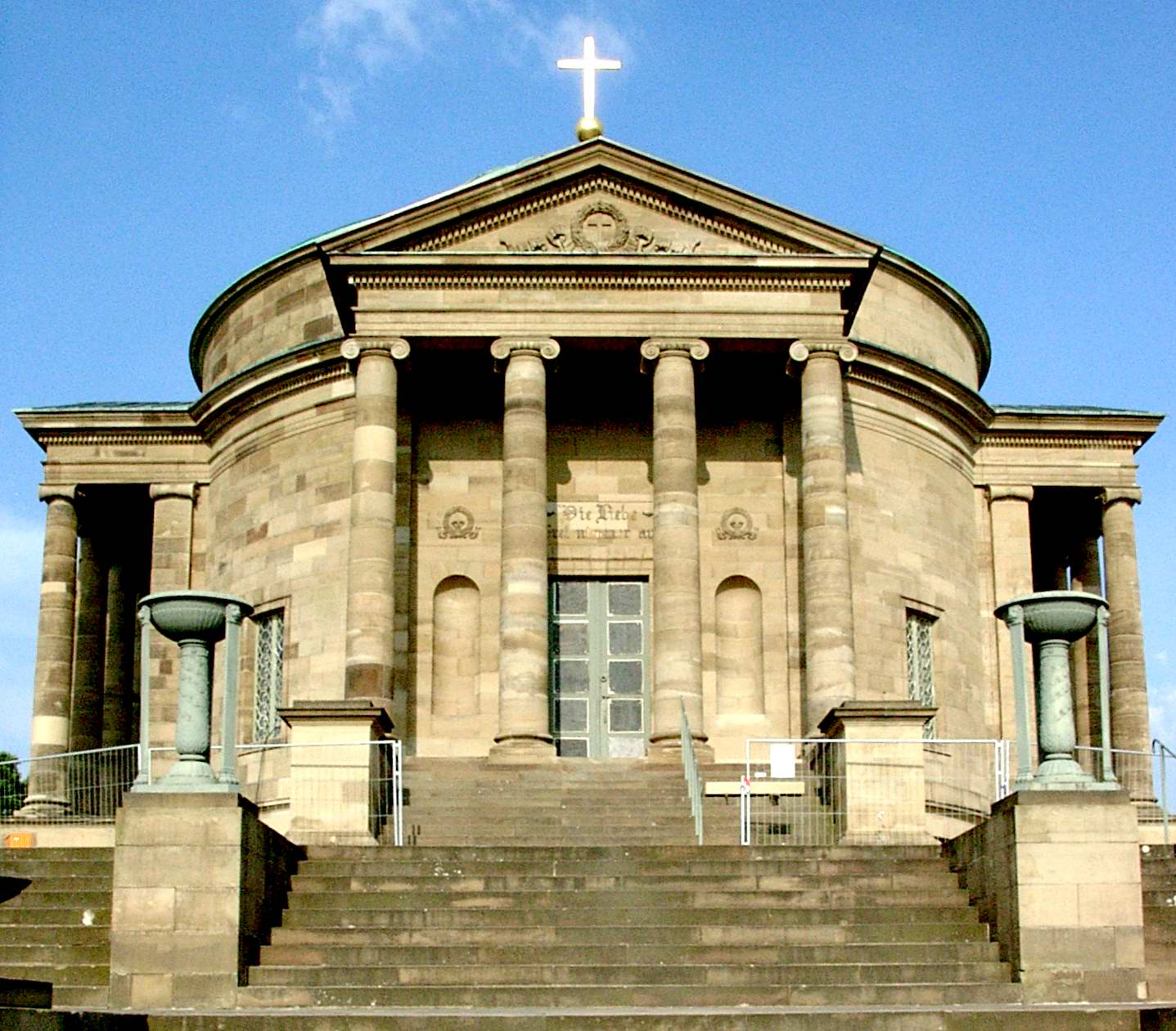
- Württemberg Mausoleum

Site information
- Type: Burg (Castle)

Location
- Coordinates: 48°46′55.47″N 9°16′7.23″E

Site history
- Built: 1080
- In use: 1080 to 1819

Wirtemberg Castle, a ruined hilltop castle, is the second family seat of the House of Württemberg, whose ancestors had abandoned Beutelsbach Castle (also known as "Kappelberg Castle"). Built on the eponymous Württemberg mountain in a spur of the Schurwald around 411 m (1,348 ft) above sea level, it is located in the current municipality of Rotenberg in Stuttgart, between Bad Cannstatt and Esslingen am Neckar. Between 1080 and 1819, three castles with this name existed in the area.

== History ==
=== First castle ===
The first castle was constructed in 1080 and has been described as "fortification with three surrounding walls, several buildings including extensive stables, a courtyard and a stately manor." The castle's chapel was consecrated on February 7, 1083.

Conrad I, Count of Württemberg documented the castle on May 2, 1092, signing as a witness. This is the oldest document featuring the name "Württemberg." From 1092 to 1495, the castle repeatedly served as the family seat of numerous counts of Württemberg. 1311 saw the first destruction of the castle by the forces of the neighboring Free imperial cities under Emperor Henry VII.

=== Second castle ===
Reconstruction of the castle began in 1311, although in smaller dimensions than the original castle. The second castle was burned down in 1519 when the forces of the Swabian League under the command of William IV, Duke of Bavaria occupied most of Württemberg.

=== Third castle ===
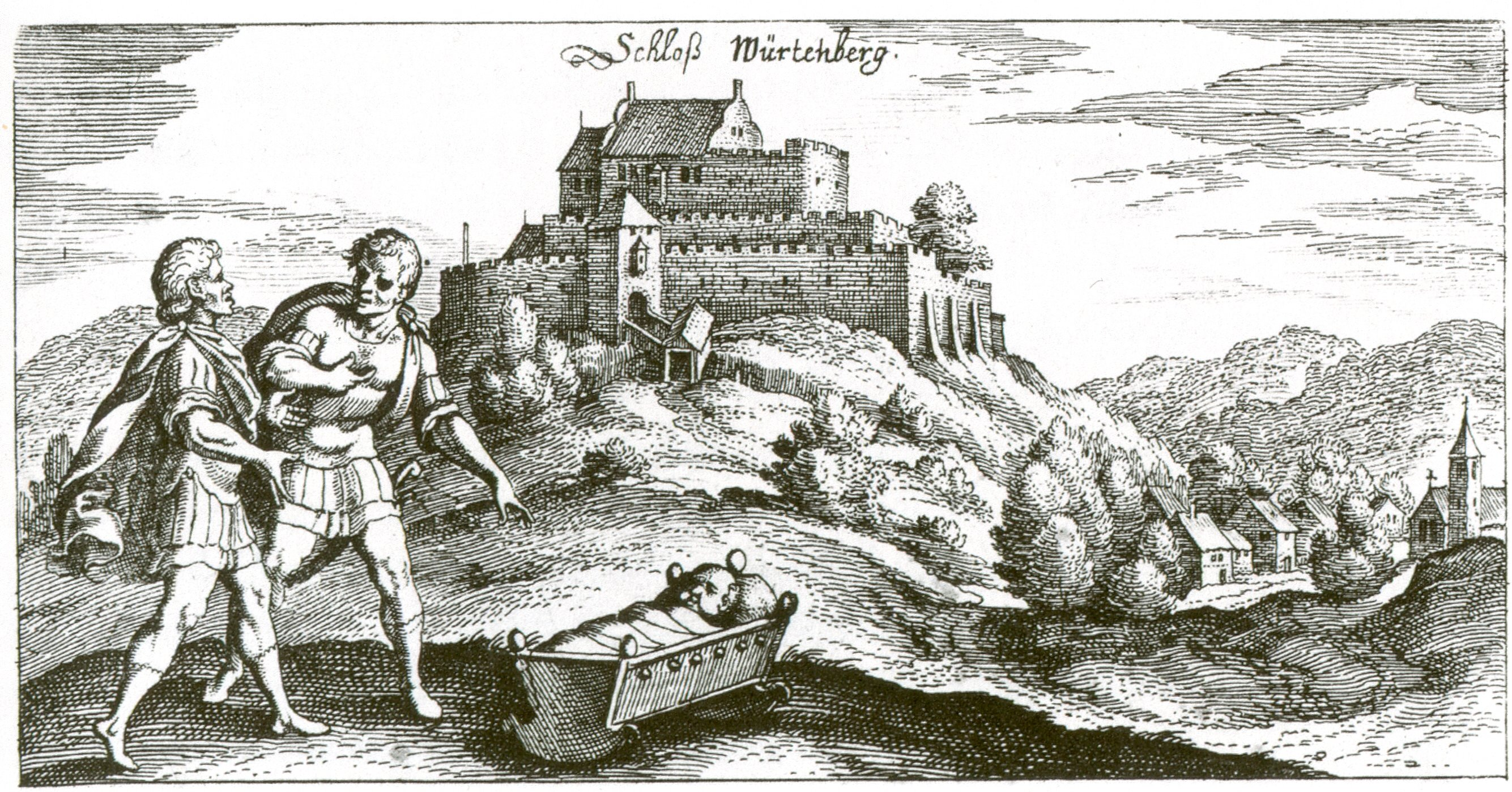
Wirtemberg, 1624: Birthplace of House Württemberg

After the destruction of 1519, Duke Ulrich rebuilt the castle for the third and last time. Wirtemberg Castle was eventually dismantled in 1819 during the reign of William I; after several hundreds years of neglect it had fallen into ruins.

=== Grave chapel ===
From 1820 to 1824, Wilhelm I. had the Württemberg Mausoleum erected for his deceased wife Katharina at the site of the dismantled third castle. Designed by Giovanni Salucci in neoclassical style it has been open to the public since 1907.

== Etymology ==
The spelling of the castle's name has changed numerous times over the centuries. Previous names include Wirdeberch, Werdenberc, and Wirtinsberk. "Württemberg" became official after the establishment of the Kingdom of Württemberg under Napoleon. The humorous wordplay "Wirt am Berg" has been in common use to this day.
