= Württemberg Mausoleum =

German mausoleum

Coordinates: 48°46′55″N 9°16′07″E

- Grabkapelle auf dem Württemberg
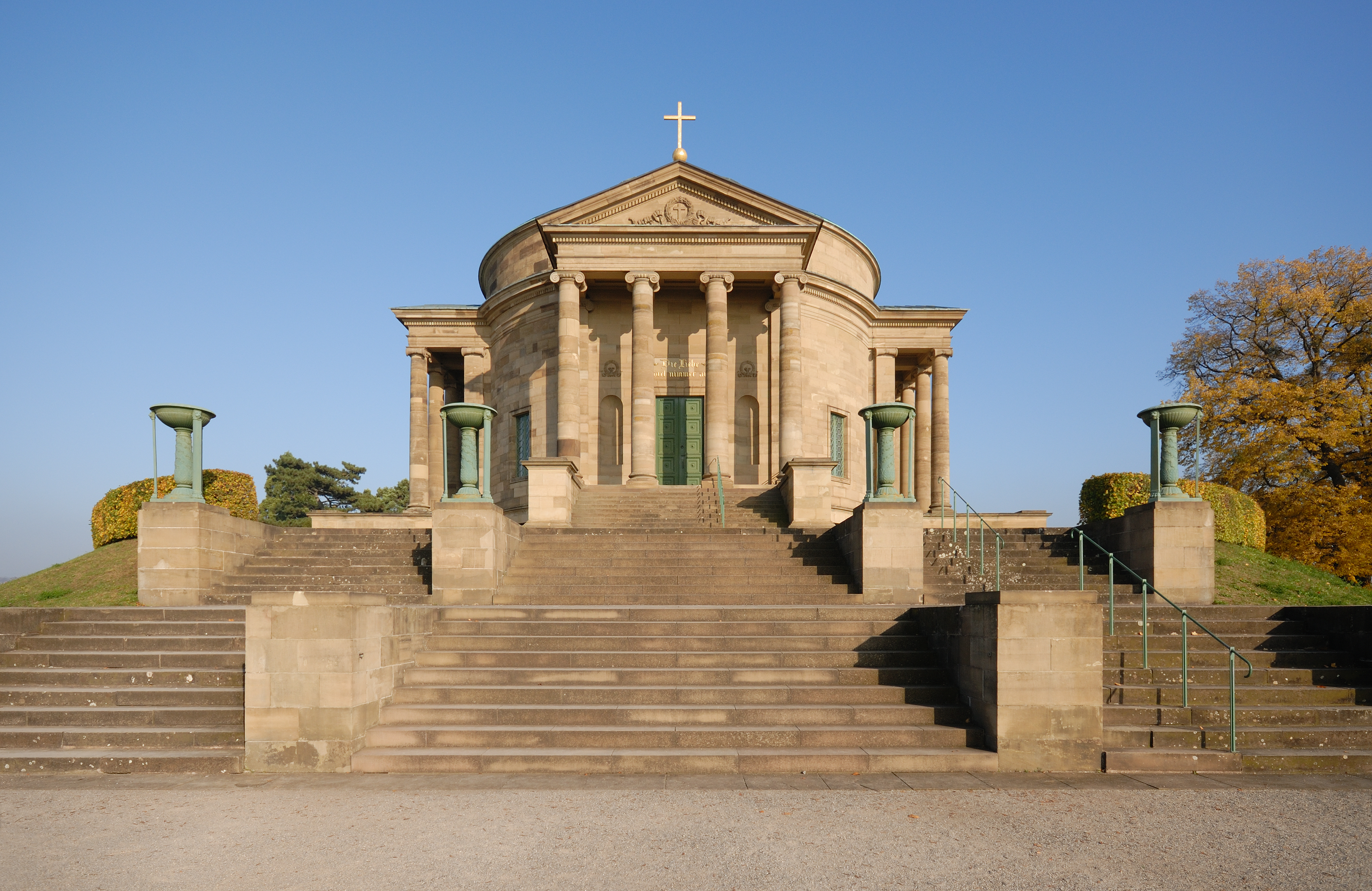
- The Mausoleum's west facade
Map location and basic information
General information
Location	Rotenberg, Germany
Coordinates
Construction started	1820
Completed	1824
Owner	Baden-Württemberg

Design and construction
- Architect: Giovanni Salucci

Website
- www.grabkapelle-rotenberg.de/en

The Württemberg Mausoleum is a mausoleum located on the Württemberg, in the Rotenberg borough of Untertürkheim, in Stuttgart. It was designed by Giovanni Salucci for King William I of Württemberg to house the remains his second wife, Catherine Pavlovna of Russia. Construction elapsed over four years, from 1820 to 1824, while work on its decor lasted another four years. The remains of William I, Catherine, and their daughter Maria Friederike Charlotte, are housed in the mausoleum.

Around 40,000 people visited the Mausoleum in 2018.

== History ==
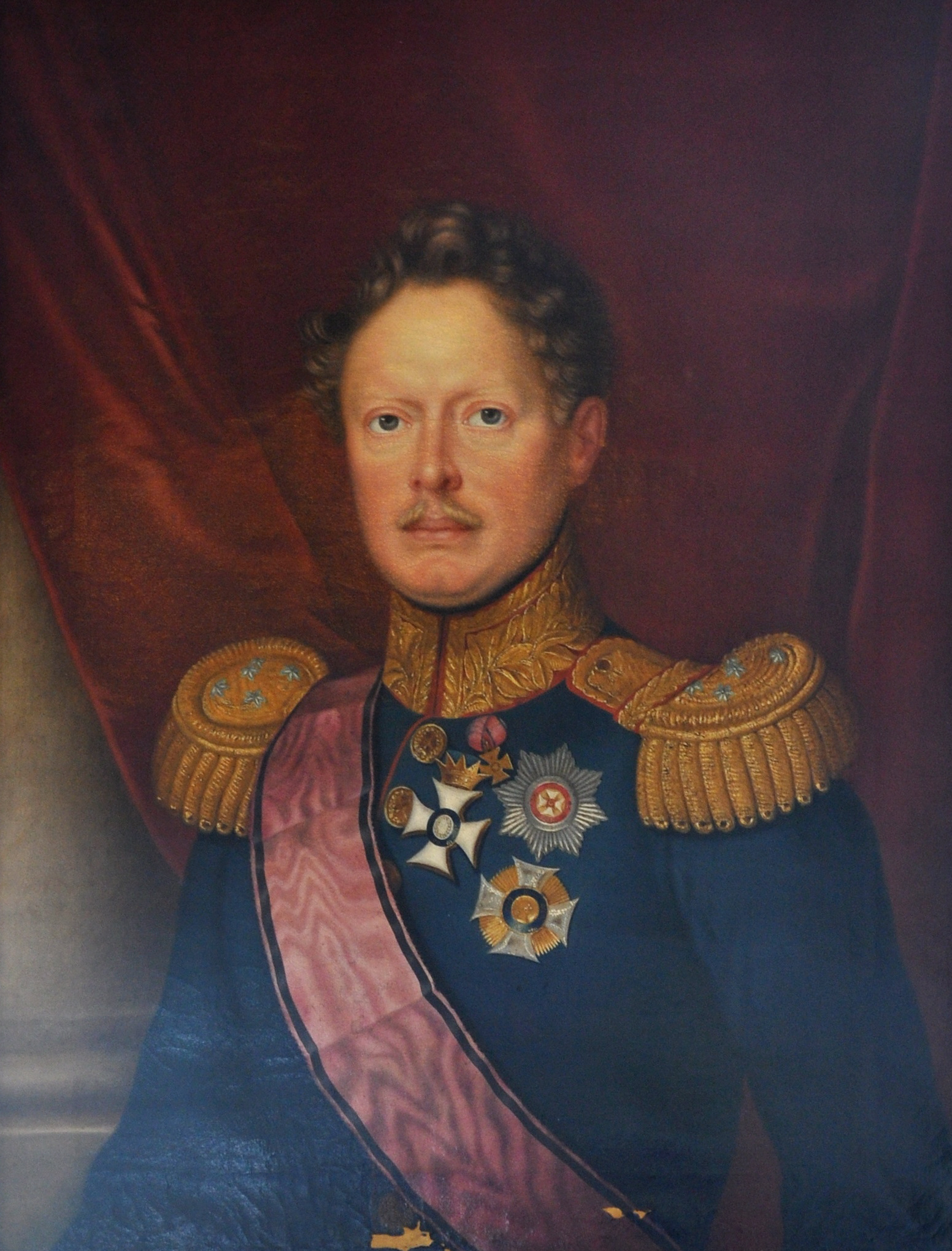
King William I

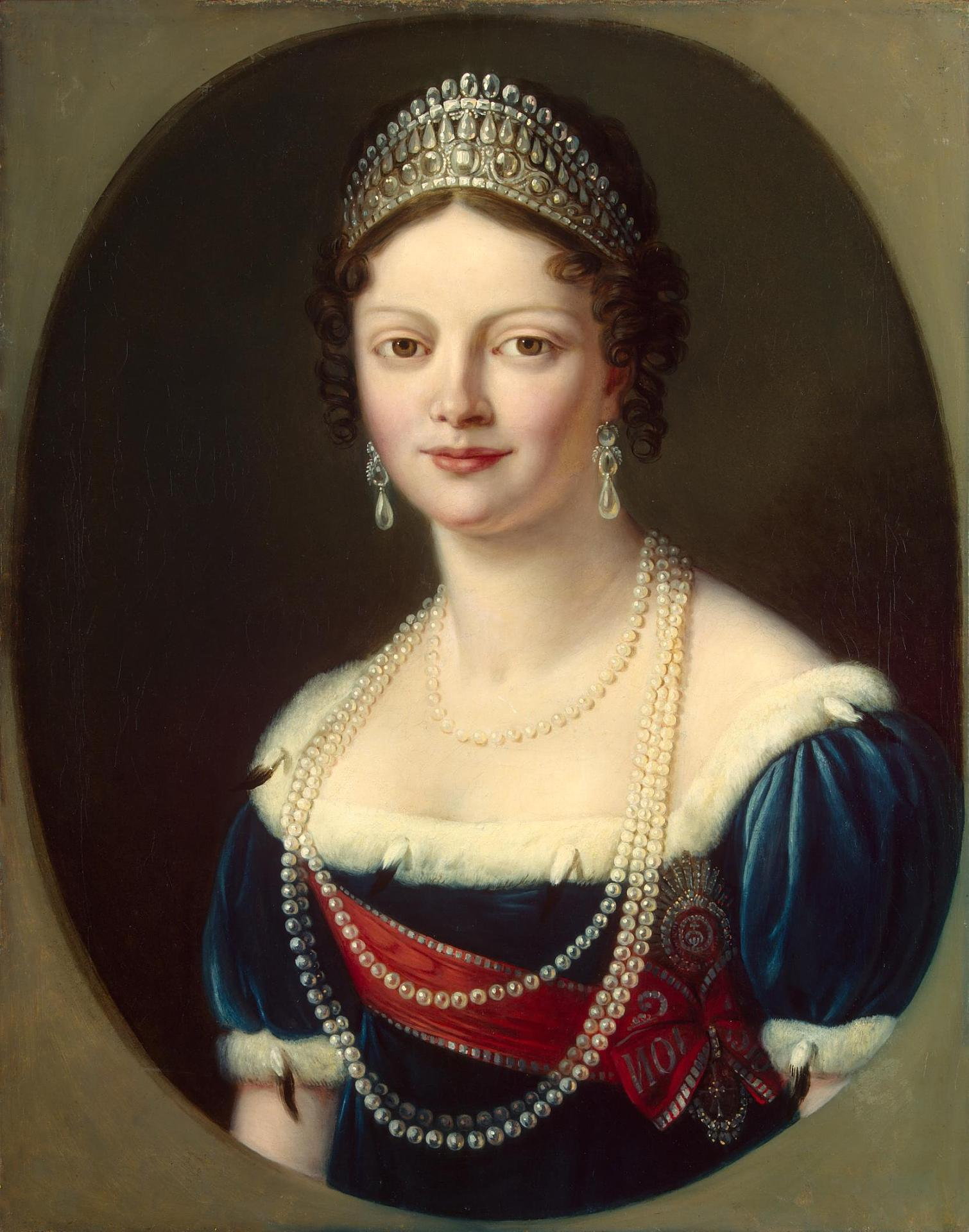
Queen Catherine

The Napoleonic Wars had drastically changed the balance of power in Europe, but especially in Germany. There Napoleon had reorganized the territories of the former Holy Roman Empire into several new French satellite states. Among those was the Kingdom of Württemberg, ruled by King Frederick I, previously Duke Frederick III, who had been coerced into alliance with Napoleonic France. In exchange for fealty to France and auxiliary Württemberger troops, Frederick was rewarded with land from smaller German states and increased rank and status. At the Congress of Vienna, Frederick was able to keep his gains thanks to his connections to the United Kingdom and the Russian Empire. While traveling to England in 1814, William, Crown Prince of Württemberg, met Grand Duchess Catherine Pavlovna of Russia, his cousin and a recent widow. The two fell in love, but William was already married to a Bavarian princess, Caroline Augusta of Bavaria. The pair met again in Vienna and resolved to marry, leading William to obtaining a speedy divorce from Princess Caroline on the basis of non-consummation. That same year, 1816, Catherine and William were wed, strengthening already strong ties between Württemberg and Russia.

Also in 1816, Frederick I died, elevating the newlyweds to the monarchy of a troubled state. The kingdom was in the midst of the Year Without Summer and plagued by crop failure. To help her new subjects, Catherine threw herself into relief programs and humanitarian projects. As a result, Catherine earned the respect and admiration of the common people.

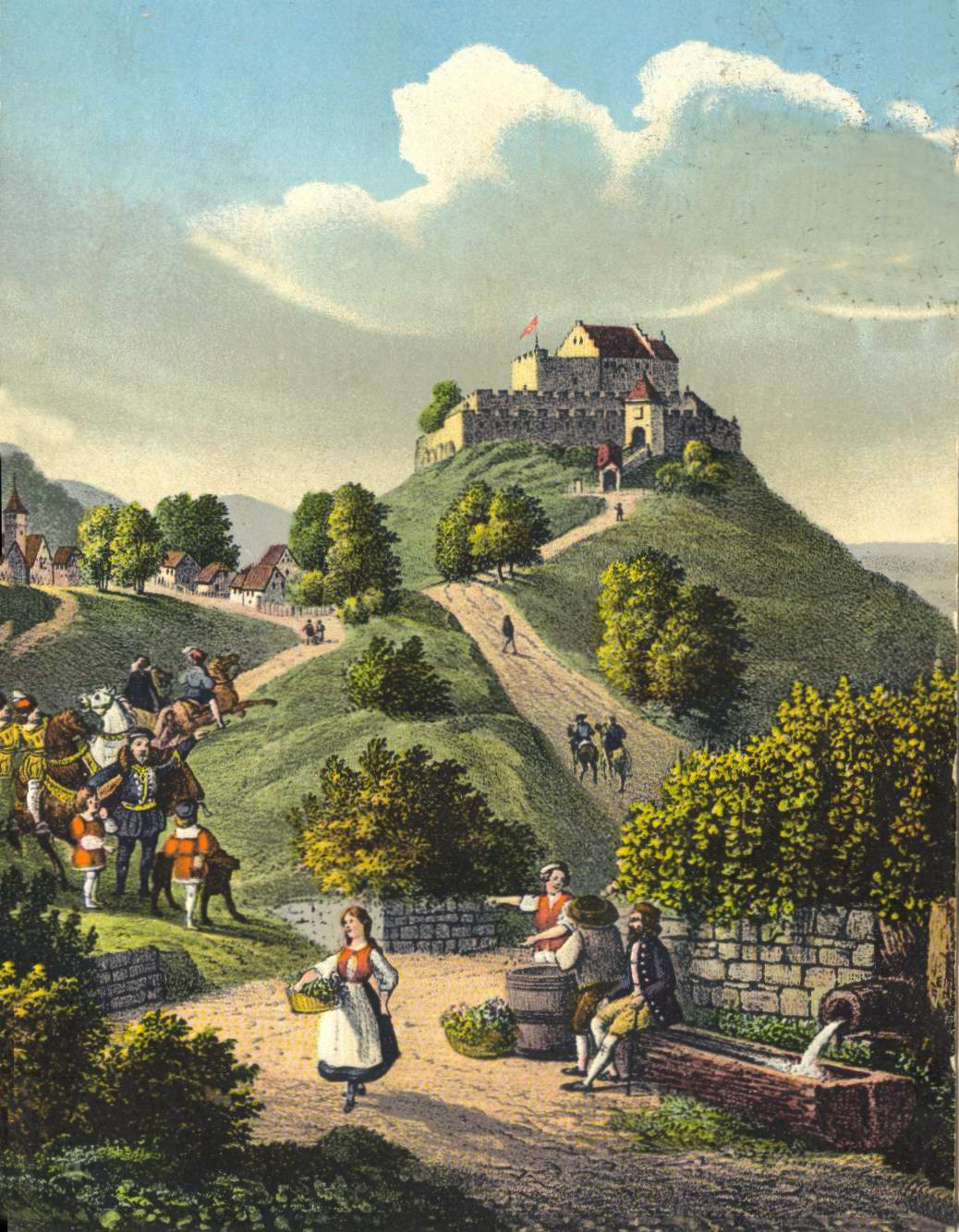
Wirtemberg Castle, upon whose site the Mausoleum was built

In early 1819, Catherine, sick with a cold, lanced a blister on her lip. The blister became infected and rapidly led to her death by stroke.

The Württemberg was the site of the ancestral castle of the House of Württemberg. Legend claimed that the castle was built by a daughter of Frederick Barbarossa and her lover, though in fact it was built a century earlier, in 1083. The original was destroyed in 1311, forcing the Württembergs to move their seat of power into Stuttgart. Wirtemberg Castle was destroyed and rebuilt over and over again, but by the 1790s it had generally fallen into disrepair.

Before her death, Queen Catherine had asked to be buried on the Württemberg, so King William I had the castle demolished in 1819. He announced a contest to determine a plan for a Neo-Gothic structure, soliciting entries from famous architects of the time such as Leo von Klenze, Joseph Thürmer, and Heinrich Hübsch. For reasons unknown, William I chose one of three unsolicited designs by his court architect, Giovanni Battista Salucci, for a Neoclassical mausoleum. Salucci became the court architect to King William I in 1817.

While construction was underway, Queen Catherine's remains were interred in the Stiftskirche in Stuttgart. The people of Württemberg donated generously to the Mausoleum's construction fund.

=== Construction ===
The cornerstone of the Mausoleum was laid in May 1820. Construction proceeded rapidly and without difficulty; by 1821, the interiors were under construction themselves. The Mausoleum was finished in 1824.

=== Other uses ===
The Mausoleum was used as a Russian Orthodox church from 1825 to 1899. A Russian Orthodox service continues to be served every year at Pentecost.

On 25 June 1864, William I died in Rosenstein Palace, but left instructions to be interred with Catherine in the Mausoleum. Per his final testament, William's body was carried out of Stuttgart after sunset and arrived at the Mausoleum just before morning on 30 June, when was laid to rest with Catherine.

Fyodor Ivanovich Tyutchev, a Russian poet who worked in Germany and traveled to Stuttgart about in 1828, wrote the poem Rotenberg that was published in 1837.

== Grounds and architecture ==
Salucci submitted at least three plans for the Mausoleum during the 1819 contest, all for a Neoclassical structure. The design used for the Mausoleum was inspired by Andrea Palladio's Villa Capra "La Rotonda".

The Mausoleum is circular, with four arms, three of which are porticos, approached by a staircase of four perrons, and topped with a free-standing dome. The landing of each perron hosts a cast-iron bowl for offerings, a motif taken from tombs of European antiquity and from La Rotonda. Biblical verses carved in stone are present above the north and south porticos. The Mausoleum is lit by a glass skylight at the top of the dome. This design was a compromise made between a more modest structure and a larger version with a colonnade. This is also the case for the crypt, which Salucci had intended to be decorated with reliefs. The iron and glass construction of the Mausoleum cupola is some of the earliest all-iron architecture in Germany.

In addition to the Mausoleum, two additional buildings were erected on the Württemberg. These were residences for a Russian Orthodox priest and his family, and the other for two liturgical singers. After 1895, the houses became the residencies for custodians charged with keeping the Mausoleum in good order. In 2015–16, the priest's house was remodeled into a visitor center.

=== Interior ===
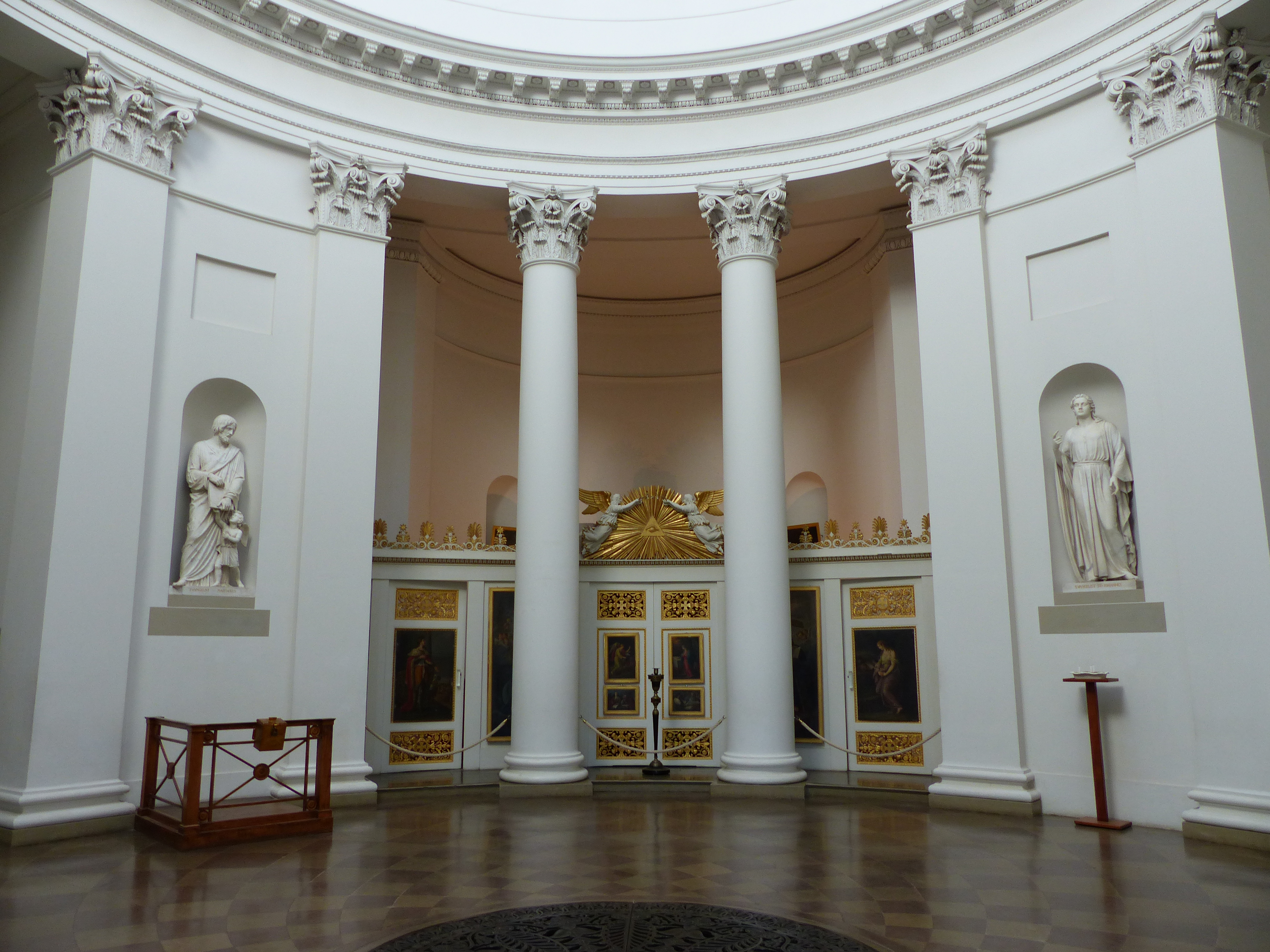
Iconostasis of the Mausoleum, flanked by the Apostles Matthew (left) and John (right)

The interior of the Mausoleum was inspired by Queen Catherine's Russian Orthodox faith and is spatially divided in the fashion of a Russian church. Those spaces are threefold: a vestibule, nave, and a chancel. The nave is wrapped by eight columns and eight pilasters, topped in the Corinthian order and flanking four niches containing statues of the Four Evangelists, which support the dome. That dome is pockmarked with recessed panels that each hold a stucco rosette, and then itself topped with a skylight. The chancel is found at the east end, but accessible only by Russian Orthodox priests. Its separating iconostasis was designed by Salucci and decorated with paintings from Queen Catherine's personal collection. Each of the Evangelists appears in medieval fashion – dressed in Roman garb, sporting a tablet, and depicted with their symbol, with the exception of John. The statues were commissioned by William I from Johann Heinrich von Dannecker and Bertel Thorvaldsen, and carved from Carrara marble. Luke, Mark, and Matthew were carved in 1825 in Rome by different sculptors. Theodor Wagner, Dannecker's student, carved Luke, while Thorvaldsen sketched the latter two but left the actual carving to his own students, Johannes Leeb and Johann Nepomuk Zwerger. Dannecker himself carved John in a humanist fashion, without beard or his symbol. John was completed and installed in 1828. Since 1928, the cornerstone of Wirtemberg Castle has been on display in the north arm of the chapel nave.

Directly beneath the nave chapel is the crypt, accessed by a narrow staircase. The floorplan of the above chapel is retained, but lighting is provided by candles and the grated oculus in the ceiling. Queen Catherine and King William I are interred together in a double sarcophagus in the east arm, opposite busts of their likeness in the west arm, while Maria Friederike Charlotte lies in the north arm. The double sarcophagus was designed by Salucci and carved from Carrara marble by court sculptor Antonio Isopi, and records the names and dates of birth and death of the monarchs within.

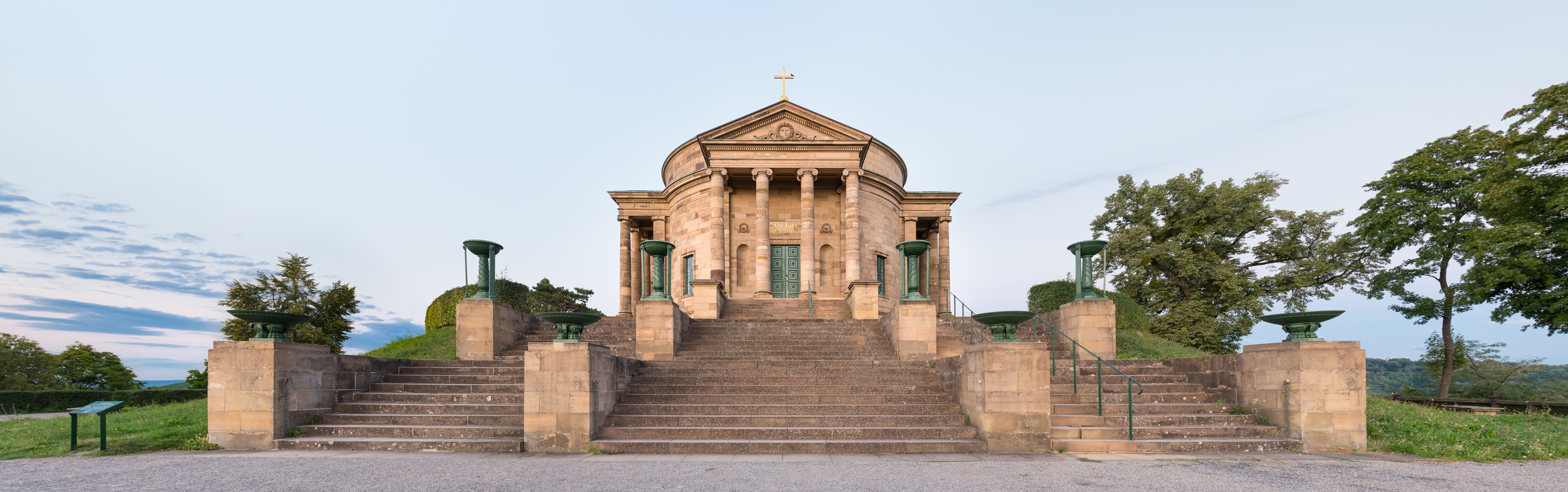
Panorama of the Mausoleum at the base of its stairs, on the west side

== See also ==
- Wirtemberg Castle
- William I of Württemberg
- Catherine Pavlovna of Russia
