= Wilhelm Palais =

Wilhelm Palace
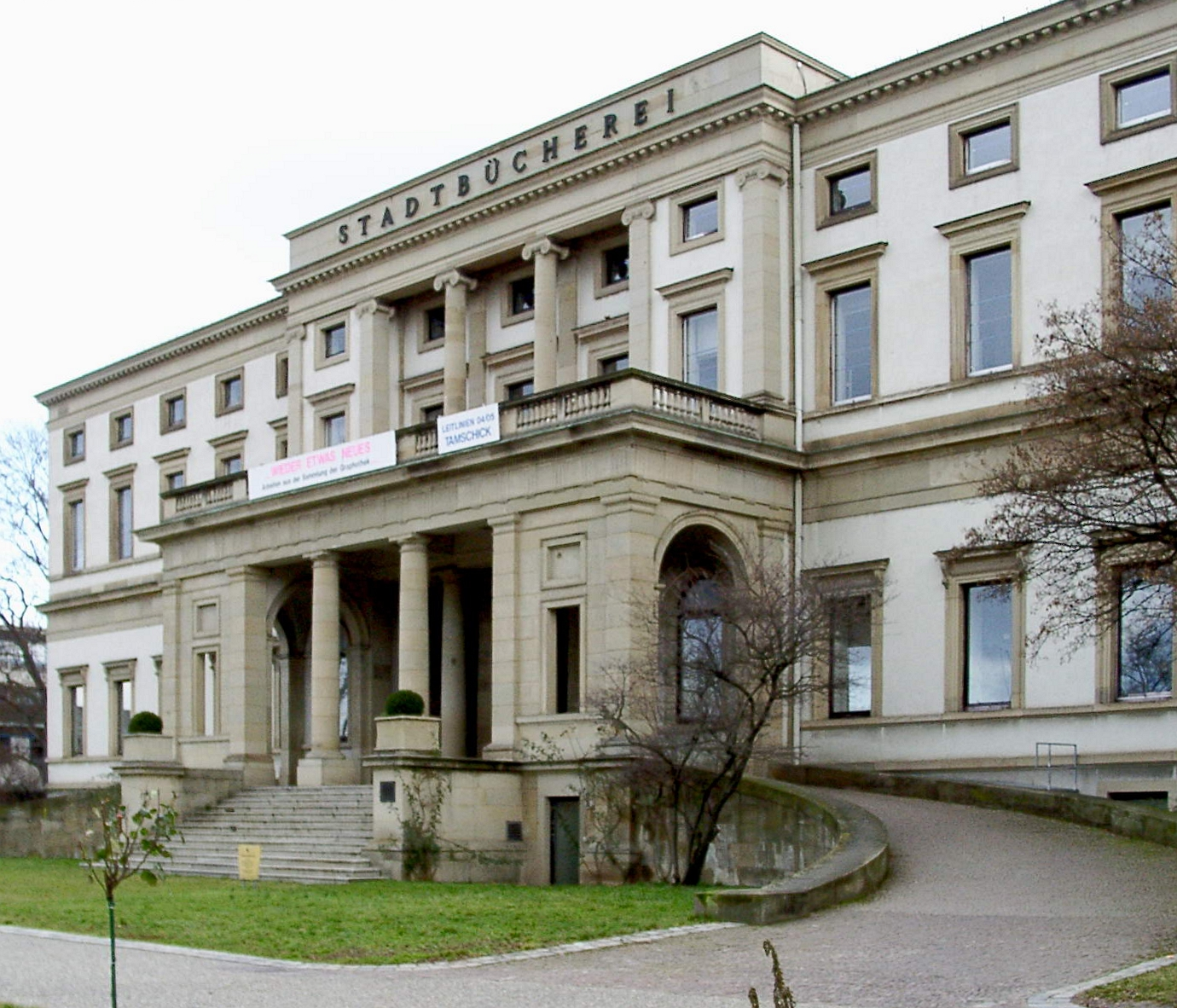
- Main facade of Wilhelm Palace

- Location within Baden-Württemberg Location within Germany

General information
- Type: Palais
- Architectural style: Classical
- Classification: Palace
- Location: Baden-Württemberg, Stuttgart, Germany
- Coordinates: 48°46′34″N 9°11′3″E

Design and construction
- Architects: Giovanni Salucci, Wilhelm Tiedje

The Wilhelmspalais (German: Wilhelm's Palace) is a Palace located on the Charlottenplatz in Stuttgart-Mitte. It was the living quarters of the last Württemberg King, Wilhelm II. It was destroyed during World War II and between 1961 and 1965 reconstructed in modern style. The central library of the town, the Stadtbibliothek Stuttgart was situated in this building from 1965 until 2011. Since 2018 the City Museum of Stuttgart is situated in Wilhelm Palais.

== History ==
The Wilhelmspalais was built from 1834 to 1840 by Giovanni Salucci, the court architect of King Wilhelm I of Württemberg in the Classical style. The king wanted to use it as a residence for his two eldest daughters, the Princesses Marie and Sophie. King Wilhelm also hired Ludwig von Zanth to design the interior of the palace.

The grandnephew of Wilhelm II, also named Wilhelm, moved into the Wilhelmpalais until Wilhelm II abdicated on 28 November 1918. On 9 November 1918, revolutionaries stormed the castle. The property passed into the ownership if the city of Stuttgart upon the abdication of Wilhelm II. It became a museum in 1929 that featured exhibitions. The building was destroyed during World War II.

Between 1961 and 1965, Wilhelm Tiedje rebuilt Wilhelmspalais in Modernist style and then housed the Stuttgart City Library until 2011 when it moved to the new building at Milan court.

Since the library moved out, it has been decided that Wilhelmspalais will become a museum once more (Stuttgart City Museum). Stuttgart architects Lederer Ragnarsdóttir Oei and Jangled Nerves started work in 2014. The museum opened in April 2018.

The addition to a café and bar have been well received by the general populace, and Wilhelmspalais was a popular place to find local artists.

== Trivia ==
- A modest statue of Wilhelm II stands outside the Palais.
