= Rotenberg (Stuttgart) =

Village in Baden-Württemberg, Germany

Coordinates: 48°47′00″N 9°16′17″E

- Village
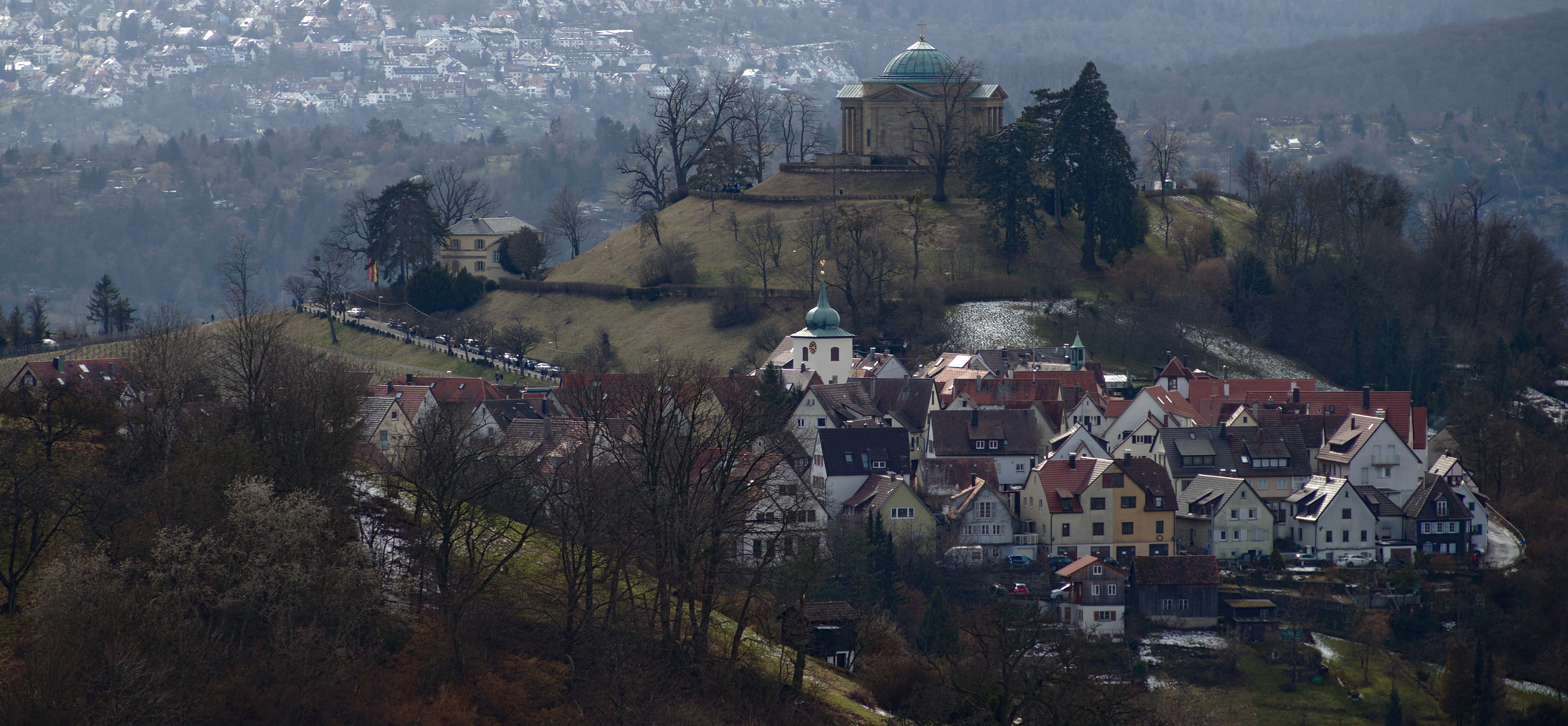
- Rotenberg

- Location in Germany
- Country: Germany
- State: Baden-Württemberg
- City: Stuttgart
- District: Untertürkheim
- Founder: Conrad of Beutelsbach

Rotenberg is a village which is a part of the Untertürkheim district of the City of Stuttgart, Germany. The area overlooks Untertürkheim and the Neckar valley and lies on the north and east slopes of the hill known as Württemberg (previously Wirtemberg). On this hill the first castle of the Counts of Württemberg was built in 1083 by Conrad of Beutelsbach who subsequently became Konrad I, Count of Württemberg and is considered the founder of the Württemberg dynasty.

The hill also gave its name to the State of Württemberg. The castle was rebuilt in 1316 by Count Eberhard I. However, in about 1330 Eberhard built the "Old Castle" in what is now the centre of Stuttgart. The castle on Württemberg fell into disuse as a royal residence.

In 1534 the castle was rebuilt a third time by Ulrich, Duke of Württemberg who had been restored to the throne after entering exile in 1519.

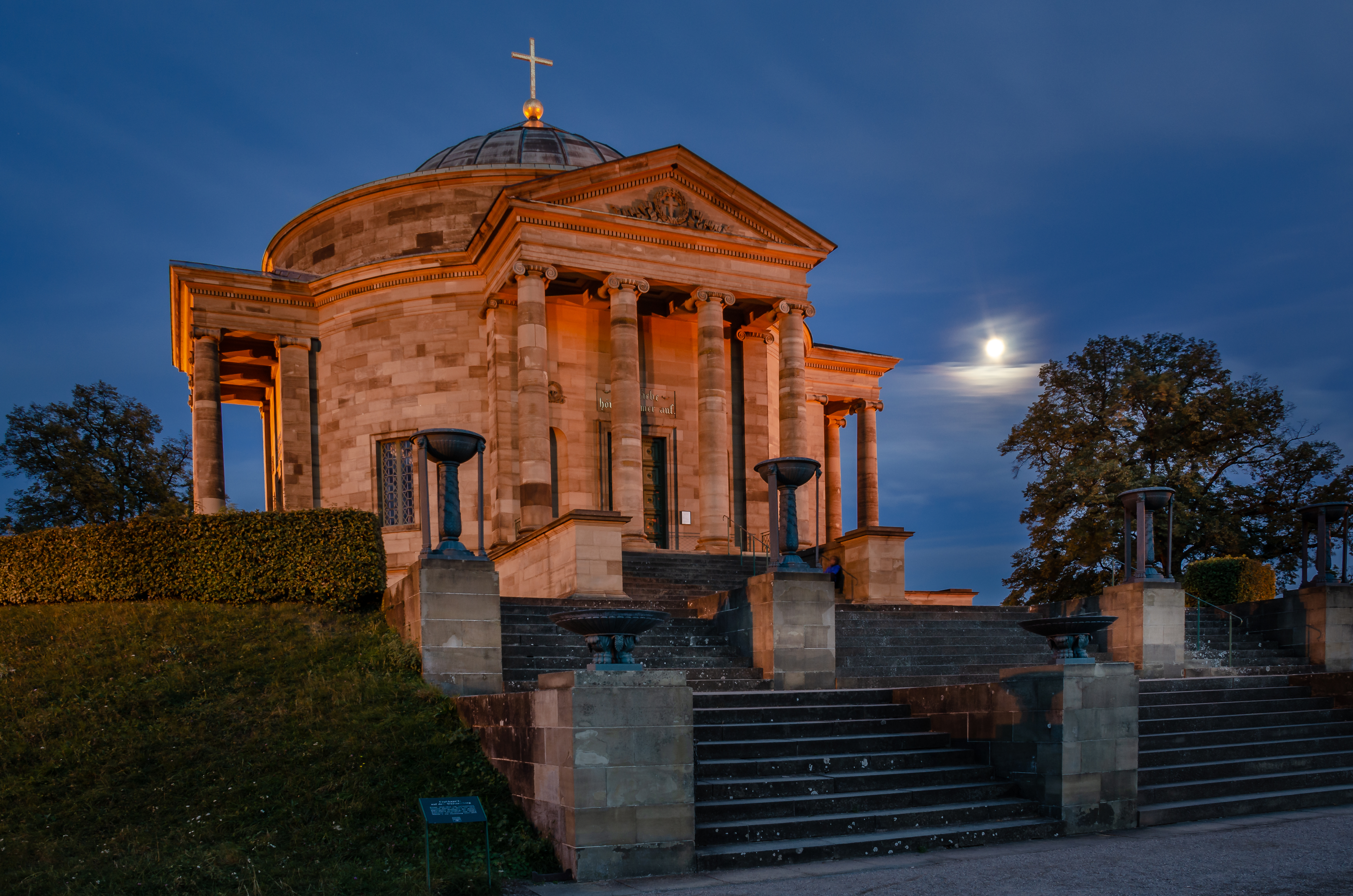
Württemberg Mausoleum

By 1819 the castle was in ruins. King William I of Württemberg (whose father, Frederick III, Duke of Württemberg became king in 1806) built Württemberg Mausoleum on the hill for his second wife Queen Catherine (1788–1819) (daughter of Tsar Paul I of Russia and Sophie Dorothea of Württemberg ). After his death in 1864, King William was also buried in the mausoleum (German: "Grabkapelle Württemberg"). Today the mausoleum is an important local landmark as it is visible from many areas of east Stuttgart.

Among the notable people associated with Rotenberg are Christian Gentner and Käte Schaller-Härlin.
