= Giovanni Salucci =

Italian architect (1769–1845)

- Born: Giovanni Battista Salucci; 1 July 1769; Florence, Grand Duchy of Tuscany
- Died: 18 July 1845 (aged 76); Florence, Tuscany, Italy
- Education: Accademia delle Arti del Disegno
- Occupation: Architect

Giovanni Battista Salucci (born 1 July 1769 in Florence; died 18 July 1845 in Florence) was an Italian architect.

== Life and work ==
In 1783 Giovanni Salucci began studying architecture at the Accademia di Belle Arti in Florence. He received his first commissions during study trips to Rome and the Veneto.

In 1797, during a stay in Bologna, he moved in political circles close to the ideas of the French Revolution. Salucci thereby aroused the mistrust of the government of the Habsburg Grand Duchy of Tuscany and was sentenced to death in absentia in 1798. Thereupon he joined the French Italian Army.

In 1801 he was employed as topographer for the Cisalpine Republic, a daughter republic under Napoleon in northern Italy, and in 1802 he worked on the fortifications of Alessandria, Mantua, and Verona.

Afterwards he took part in the French invasion of Russia. He survived and managed to escape to Danzig. After the Battle of Waterloo he fell into English captivity, from which he was released in 1816.

After his release, he initially worked for the Geneva banker Jean Gabriel Eynard, from whom he received a recommendation for King Wilhelm I of Württemberg. The latter appointed him court architect in 1818.

In Württemberg, the Royal Pavilion in Weil near Esslingen was initially built in collaboration with the Queen Catherine of Württemberg, who was a passionate lover of architecture. In 1819, after her death, he built her Württemberg Mausoleum. From 1823 to 1829 the Schloss Rosenstein was built according to the plans of Salucci. Other buildings designed by him are the Wilhelmspalais and the Alte Reithalle (royal riding hall), both in Stuttgart.

Since the planned costs for the Royal Pavilion in Weil were exceeded, he soon had to have everything approved by the Building and Garden Directorate. In 1828, after a dispute with a superior, he applied for his dismissal. Four days later, however, he asked to be reinstated. In 1839 dry rot was discovered in Rosenstein Castle, for which Salucci was made responsible; this led to his final dismissal.

In 1840 Salucci returned to Florence almost penniless. He died there in 1845 and was buried in the cloister of the St Mark’s, Florence.

== Gallery ==
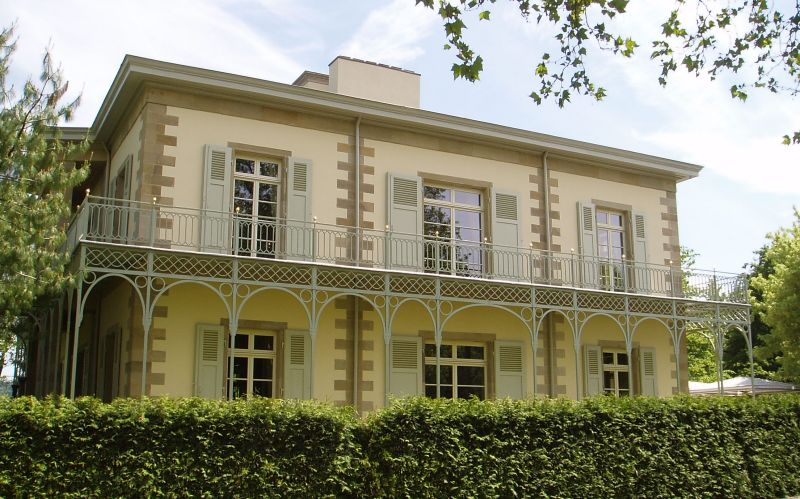
Royal pavilion in Esslingen-Weil

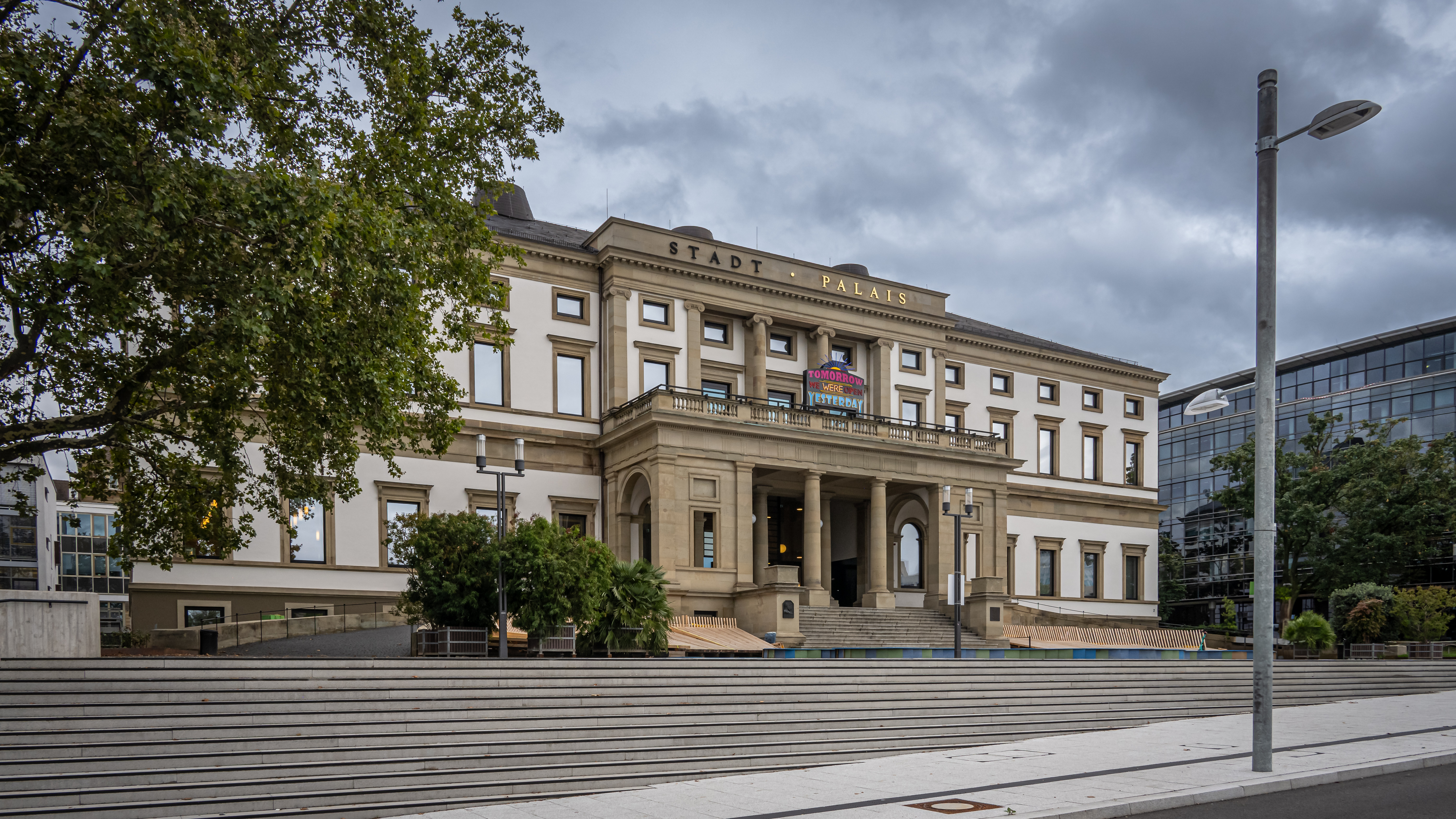
Wilhelmspalais at Charlottenplatz in Stuttgart

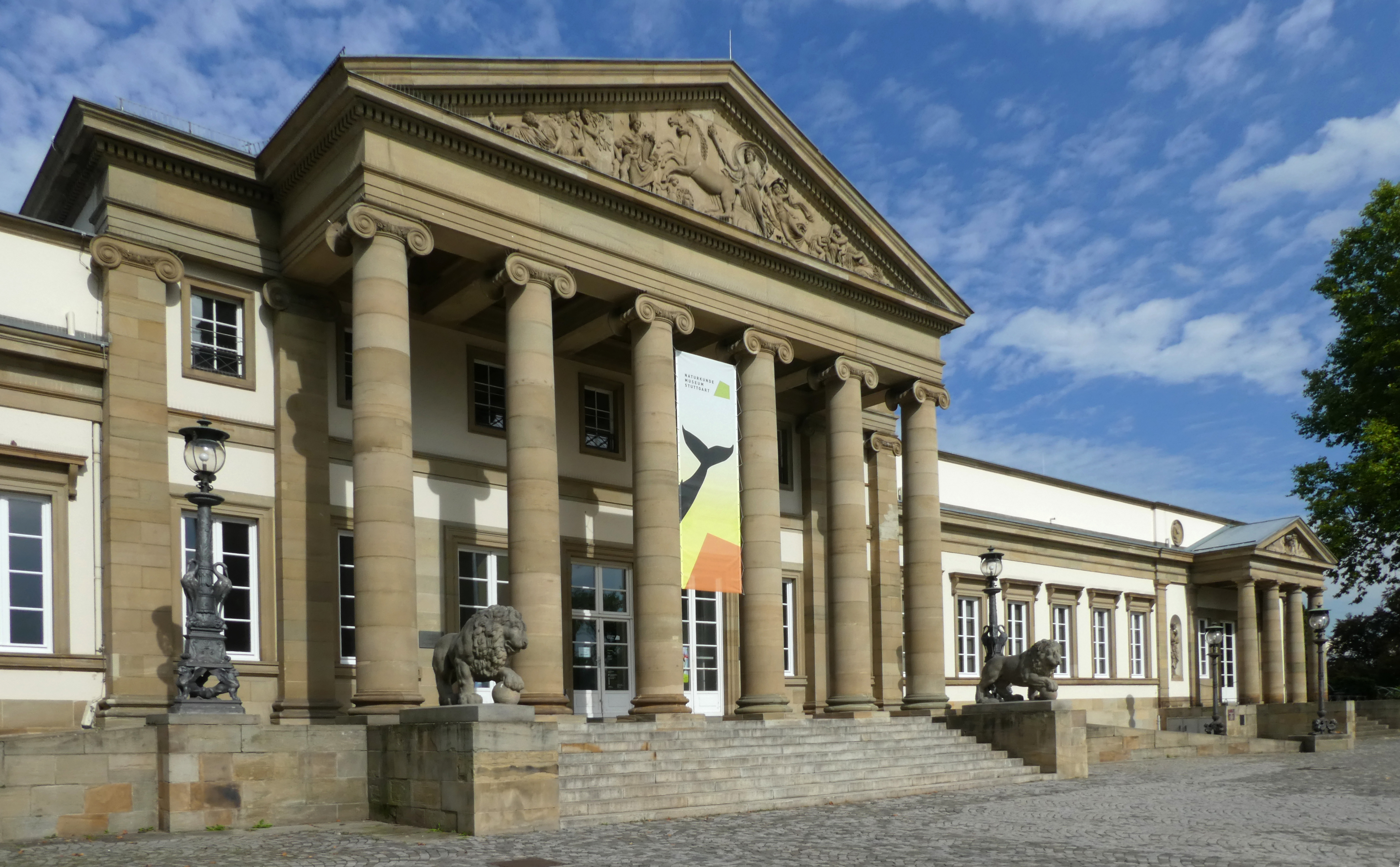
Castle Rosenstein in Stuttgart

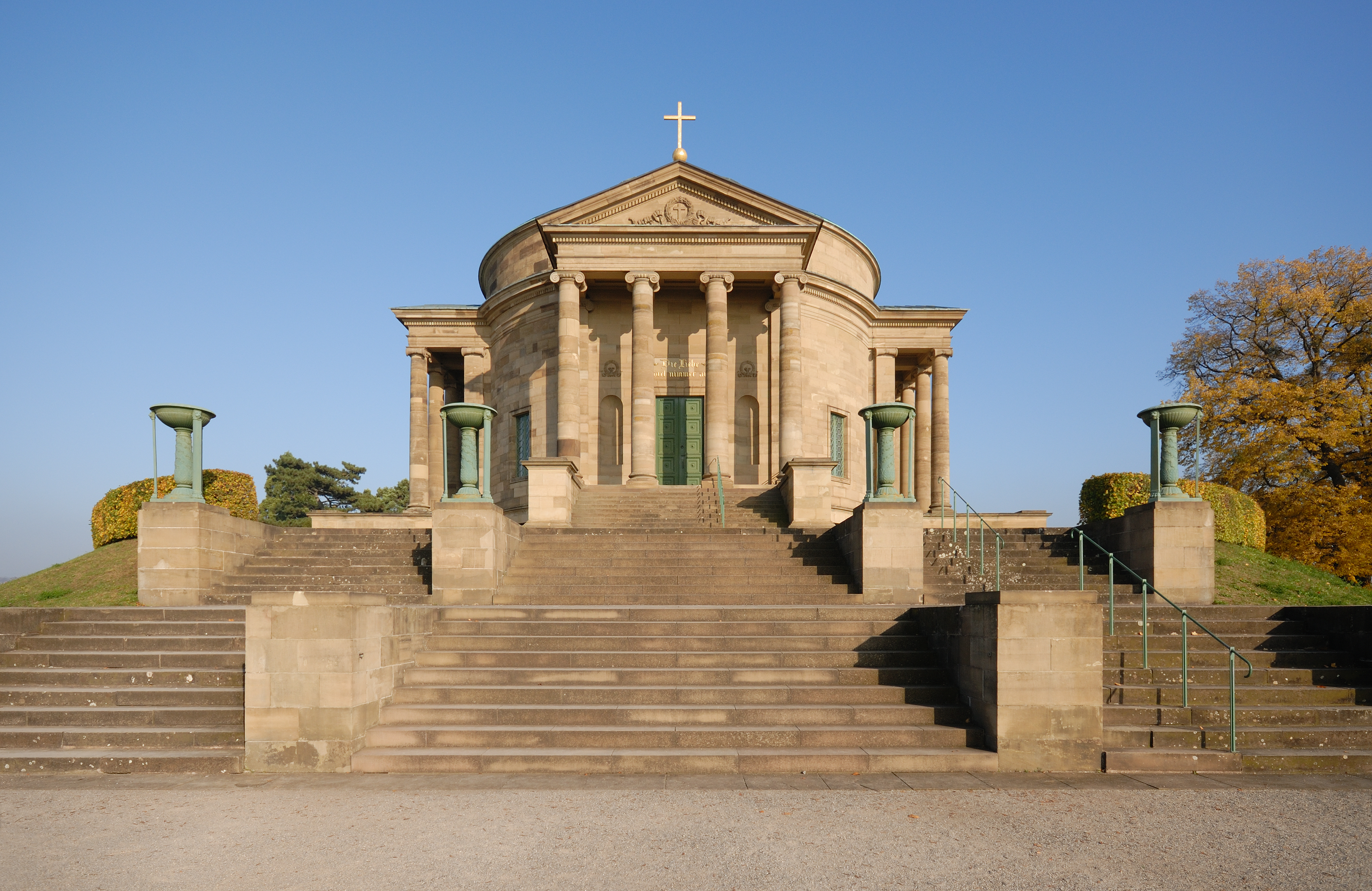
Württemberg Mausoleum in Stuttgart

== Works in Public Collections ==
- Salucci's estate, consisting of 142 drafts of buildings, is located in the Stuttgart University Library (Inv. No. Salu001-Salu142) and in the Digital Collections of the Stuttgart University Library.
- Photographic collection "Giovanni Salucci's classicist buildings in Württemberg" by Rotraud Harling in the Map and Plan Collection of the Stuttgart University Library: Map and Plan Collection.

== Literature ==
- Georg Leisten: Das zeitlos Schöne überlebt. Ausstellung: Die Stuttgarter Fotografin Rotraud Harling huldigt dem Werk des Architekten Giovanni Salucci. In: Stuttgarter Zeitung Nr. 289, 13. December 2013, page 29.
- Giuseppe Ponsi: Memorie della vita e delle opere di Giovanni Salucci Fiorentino / Erinnerungen, Leben und Werk des Giovanni Salucci Fiorentino. Florence 1850.
- Giuseppe Ponsi; Bruno Zoratto (editor): Giovanni Salucci in den Beschreibungen eines Freundes / Giovanni Salucci nelle descrizioni di un amico. Stuttgart 1998. Reprint of Ponsi 1850.
