= Untertürkheim =

District of Stuttgart, Germany

Coordinates: 48°47′06″N 9°15′20″E

Untertürkheim (German pronunciation: [ʊntɐˈtʏʁkhaɪm], lit. 'Lower Türkheim') is a district of Stuttgart, the capital of the German state of Baden-Württemberg. It is located on the right bank of the Neckar River in the east of the city. Untertürkheim is surrounded by the districts of Obertürkheim, Hedelfingen, Wangen, and Bad Cannstatt, as well as the municipality of Fellbach (Rems-Murr district).

== History ==
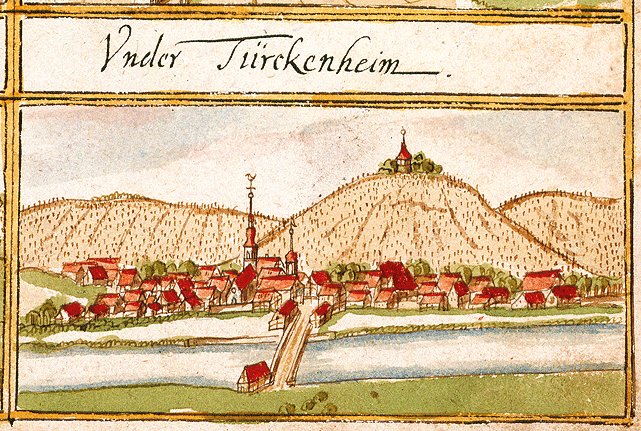
Untertürkheim 1685, Forstlagerbuch von Andreas Kieser

Untertürkheim was first mentioned in 1121 as Durinkheim. The name probably goes back to an Alemannic chieftain in the 4th century, after whom the town was named Duringoheim. The name in today's dialect is (Onder-)Dürkna.

In the High Middle Ages, Untertürkheim belonged to the Duchy of Swabia and, after its dissolution, became a core part of Old Württemberg. Due to its location on the river, Neckar rafting was once an important source of income. In addition, winegrowing was and remains of great importance in Untertürkheim due to the exposure of the Neckar Valley slopes. Numerous wineries (some with wine taverns) and two cooperative wineries are located in Untertürkheim (Weinmanufaktur Untertürkheim) and in Rotenberg.

In 1449, Untertürkheim was devastated by troops from the Imperial City of Esslingen. During the Thirty Years' War, after the devastating defeat of the Heilbronn League at the Battle of Nördlingen, when the Duchy of Württemberg was defenselessly exposed to the Imperial Army from 1634 onward, 240 buildings in Untertürkheim were burned down.

During the administrative reform of the Kingdom of Württemberg at the beginning of the 19th century, Untertürkheim remained assigned to the Cannstatt district and thus belonged to the Neckar district from 1818. On October 22, 1845, the first Württemberg railway ran on the section of the Central Railway from Cannstatt to Untertürkheim.

The scheduled tram service, and thus the connection to the Stuttgart tram network, took place on 26 November 1910 with line 15 from Schlossplatz via Wangen to the Untertürkheim Neckar Bridge.

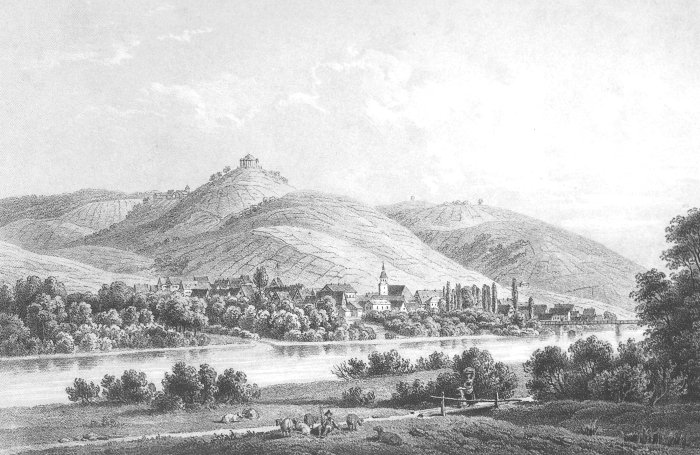
View Untertürkheim in 1860

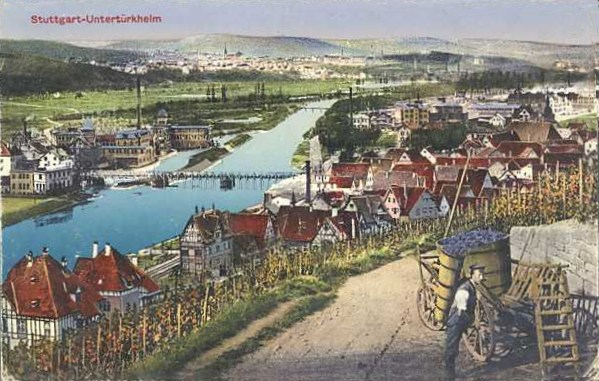
Postcard from 1906

== Culture and sights ==
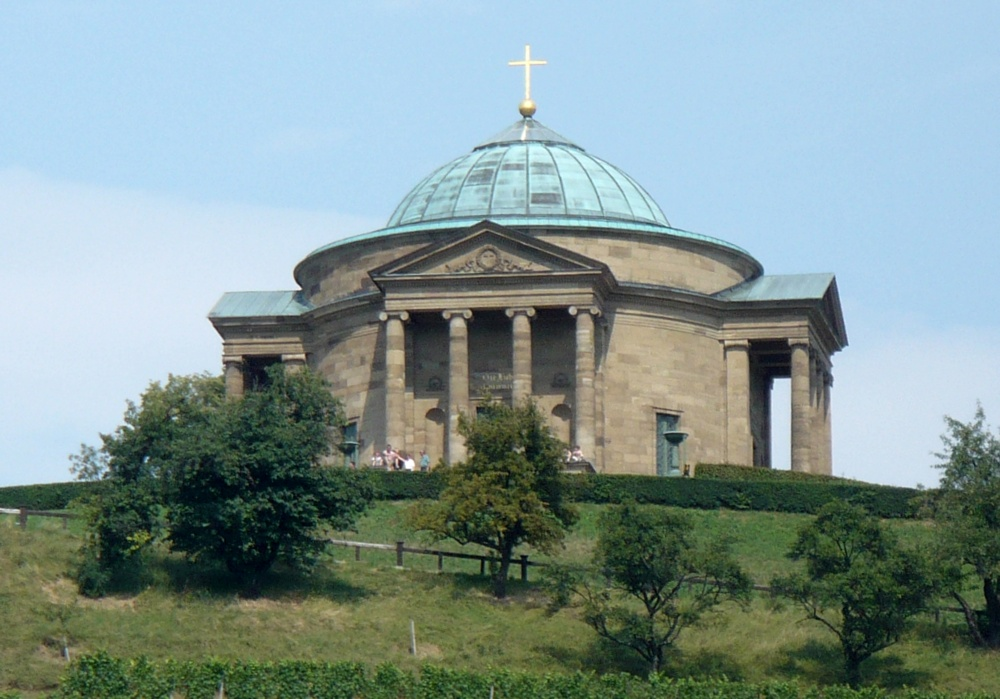
Burial chapel on the Württemberg in Rotenberg in Rotenberg

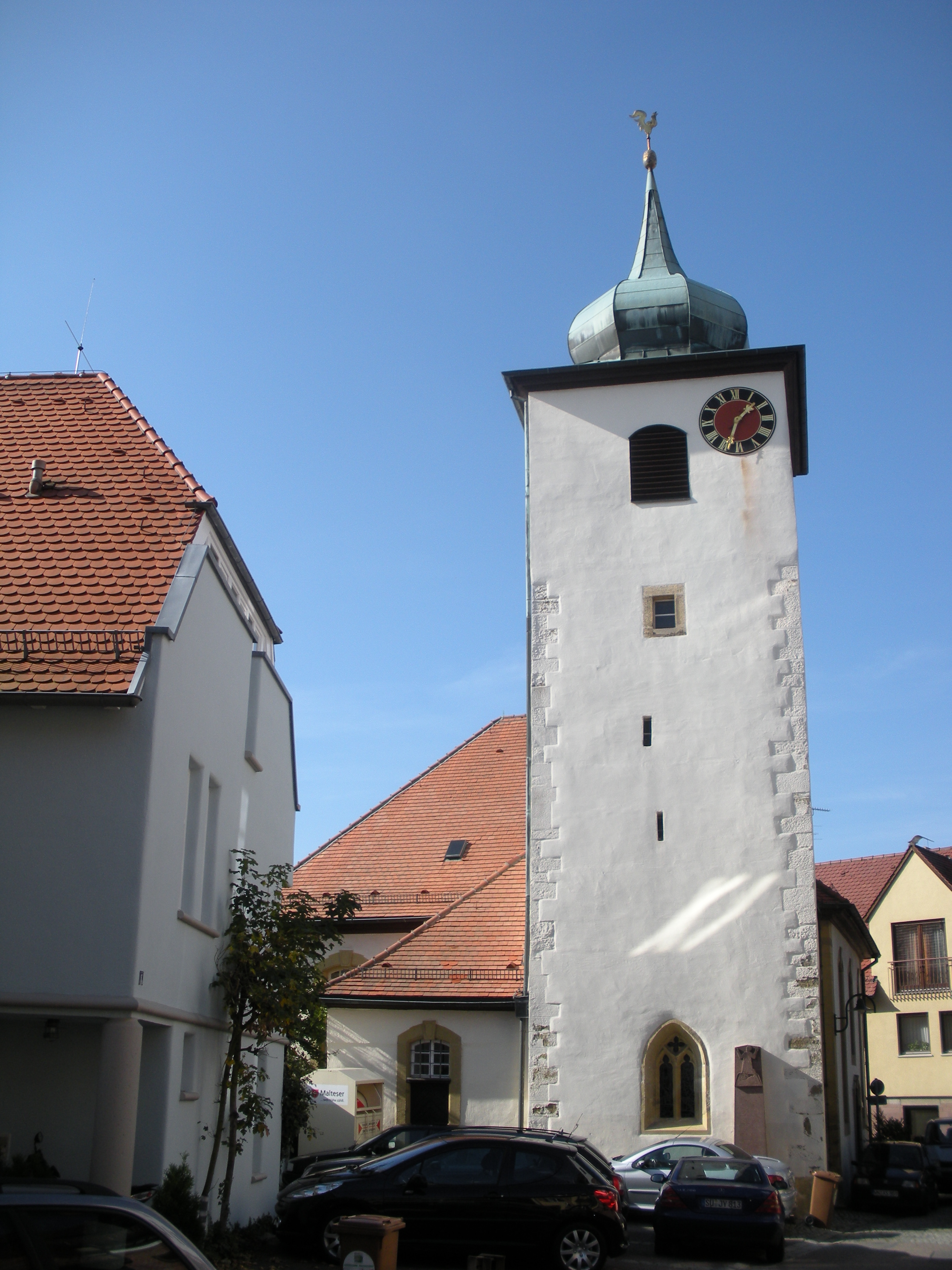
Barock-Dorfkirche in Rotenberg in 1754

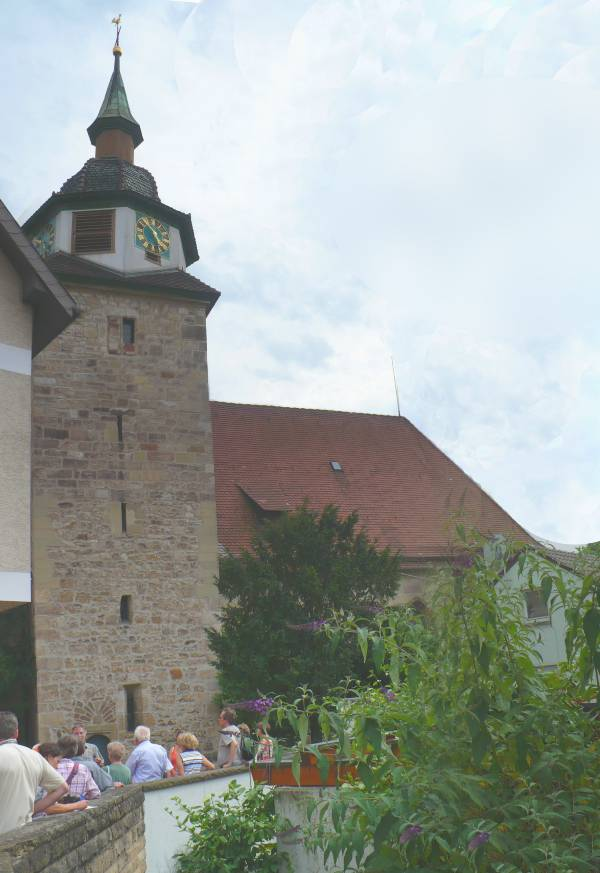
Stadtkirche Untertürkheim mit Grieshaber-Altarwand

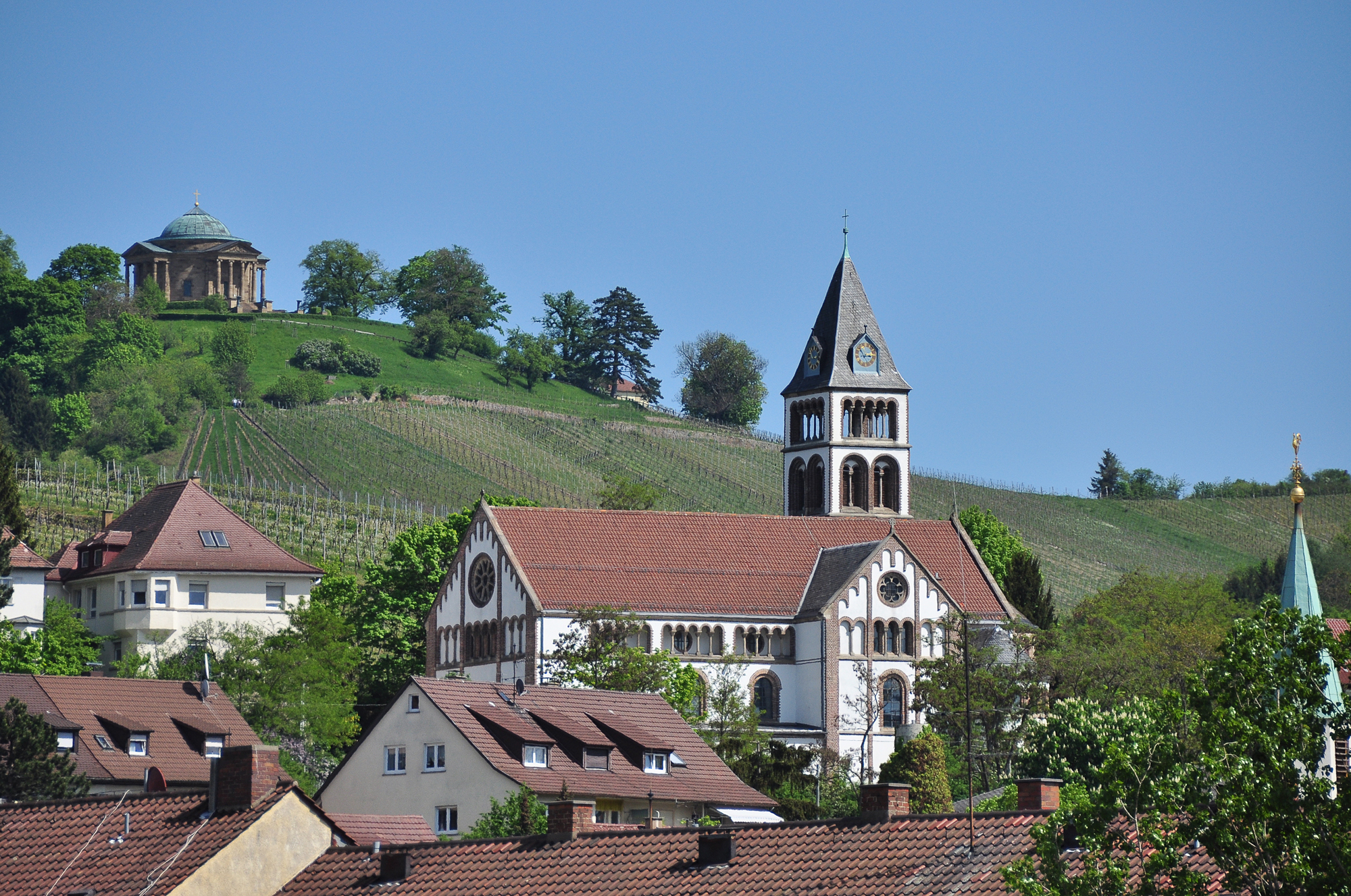
Catholic Church of St. John the Evangelist

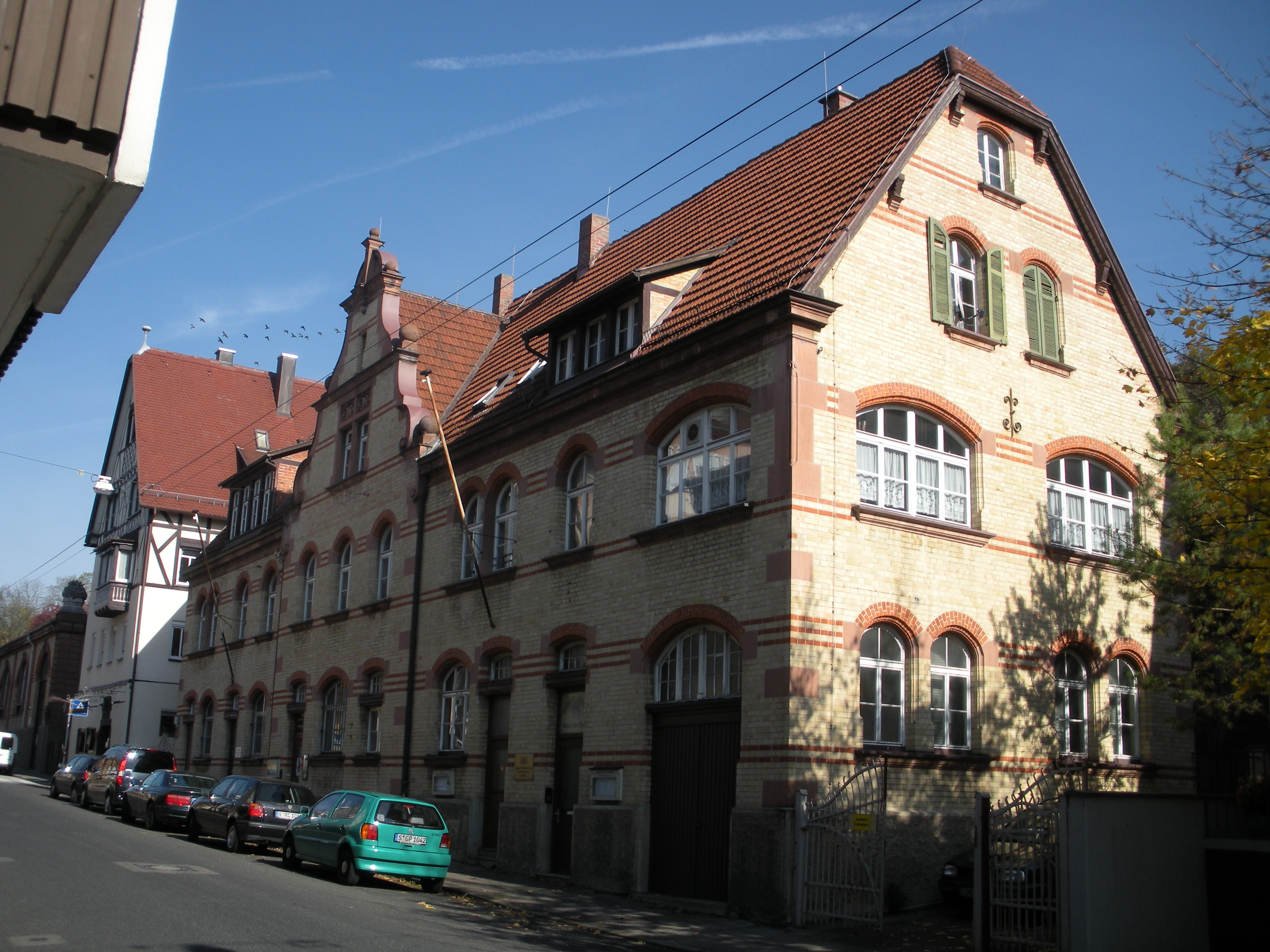
Municipal distillery with cultural meeting place in the Julius Lusser House

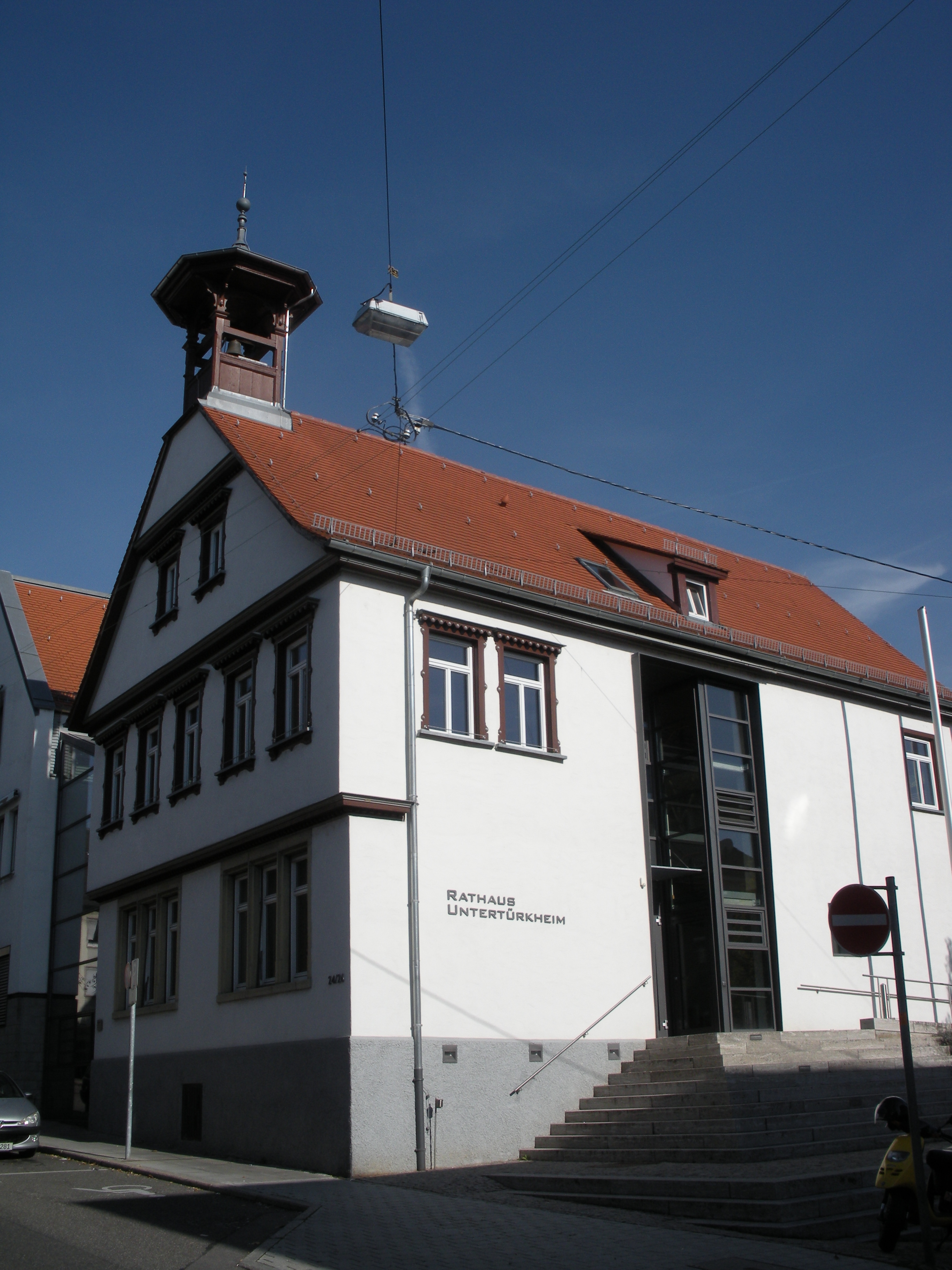
Untertürkheim District Town Hall

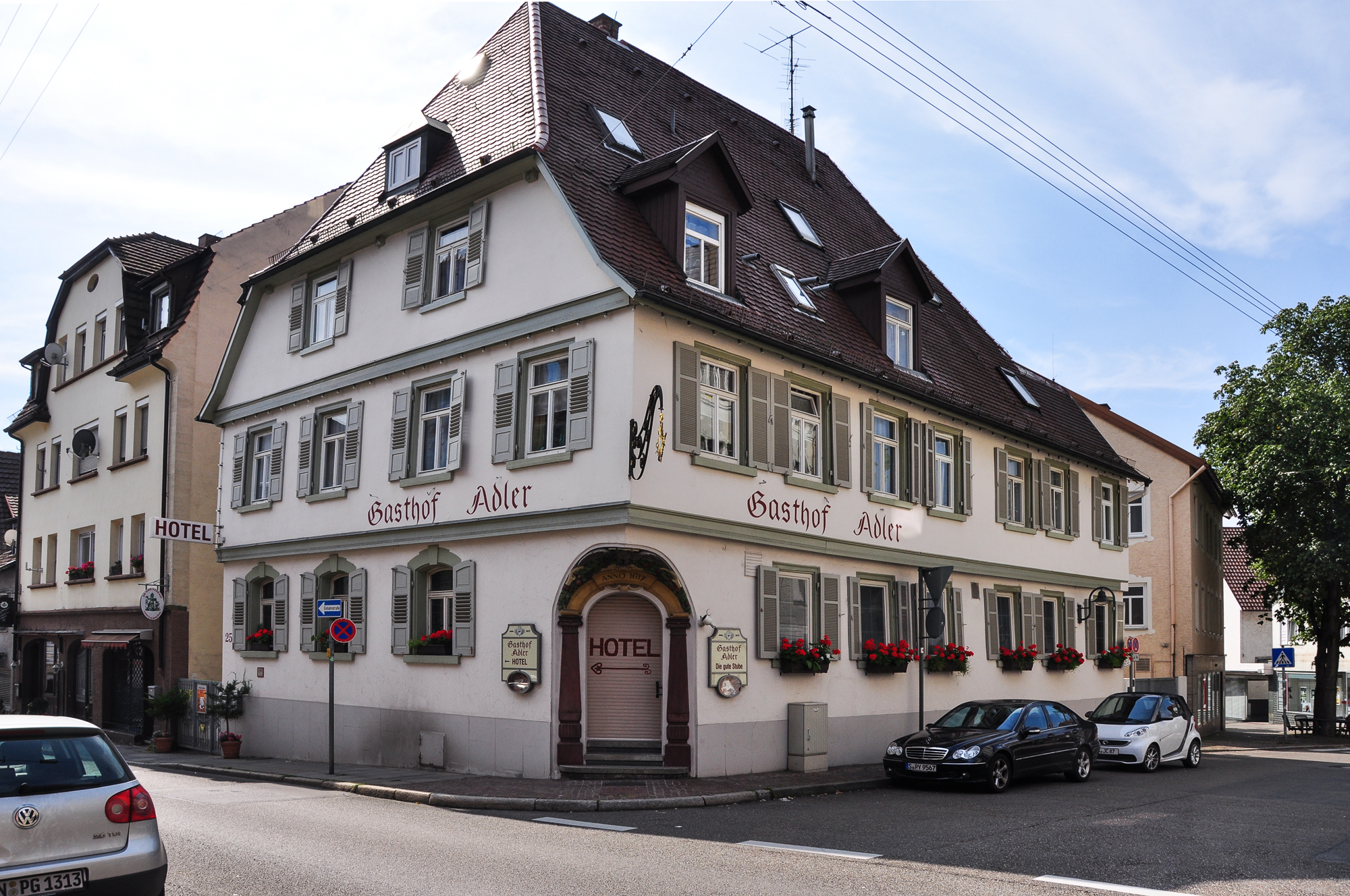
Gasthof Adler from 1617

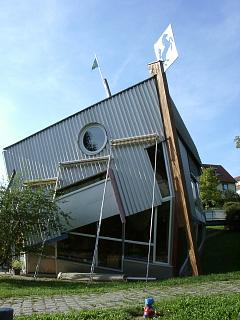
Kindergarten ship in Weinberg in Luginsland

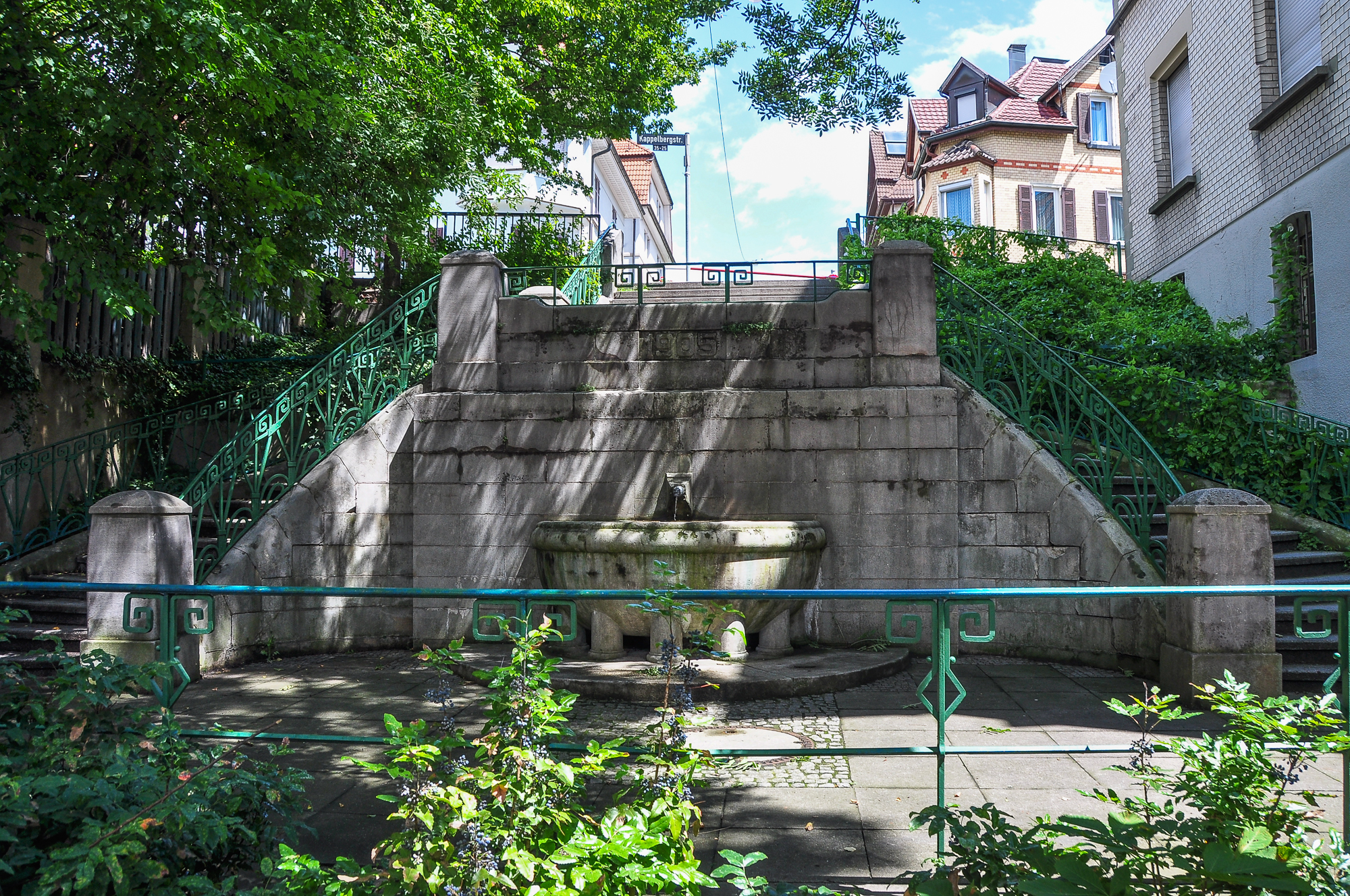
Art Nouveau Wilhelmsbrunnen from 1905

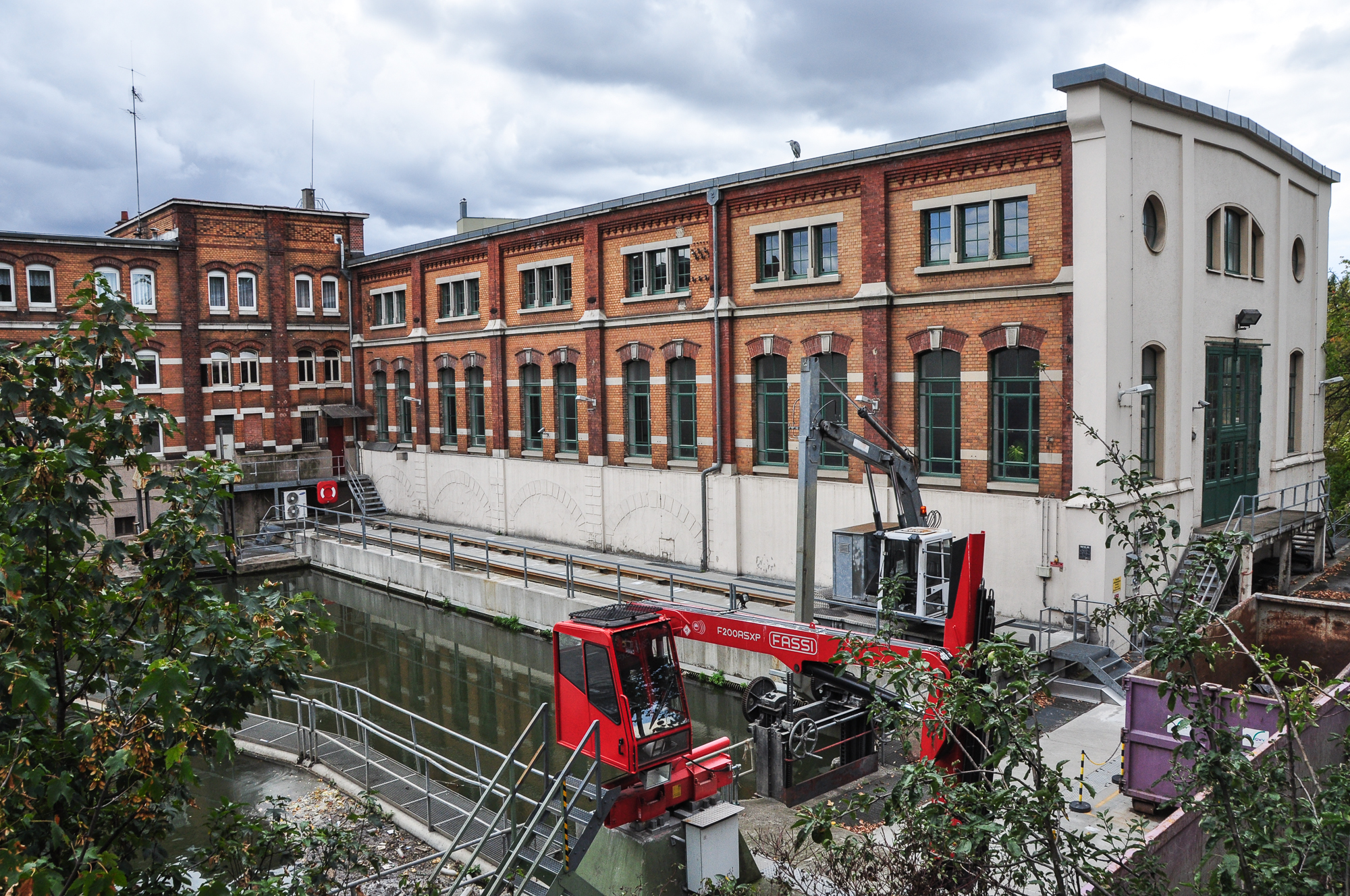
Hydro-Electric Power Plant in 1902
