= Vodafone-Funkturm Stuttgart-Vaihingen =

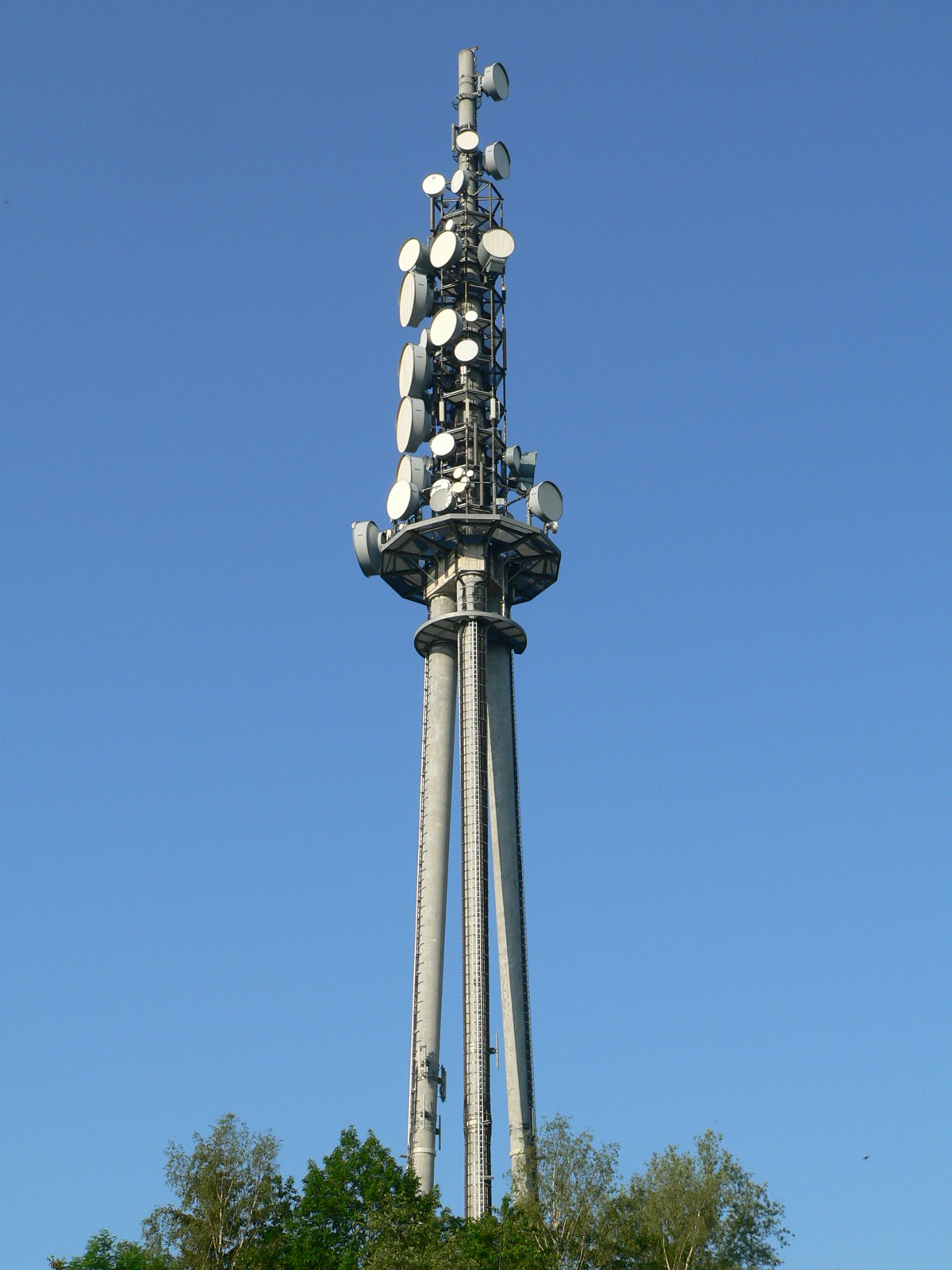
Vodafone Tower in Stuttgart-Vaihingen

The Vodafone-Funkturm (English: Vodafone Radio Tower) is a 98.6-metre-high (323 ft) tower for mobile phone services in Stuttgart-Vaihingen.

The tower is constructed from three concrete tubes which are assembled together in the form of a tripod. It was built in December 1998 in four days. It has eight platforms for aerials at 58 m (190 ft), 62.5 m (205 ft), 67.5 m (221 ft), 70 m (230 ft), 75 m (246 ft), 77.5 m (254 ft), 80 m (260 ft), and 82.5 m (271 ft). The tower is located at Pascal street in Stuttgart-Vaihingen at 48°43′41″N 9°4′46″E.

== See also ==
- List of towers
