= Büsnauer Wiesental Nature Reserve =

Coordinates: 48°44′39″N 9°05′21″E

The landscape

Büsnauer Wiesental Nature Reserve is a protected area of 28 hectares (69 acres) in the Katzenbach valley in the sub-distric (Stadtteil) of Büsnau of the outer city borough of Vaihingen in southwestern Stuttgart, Baden-Württemberg, Germany. Protected Area ID 1.163
