= Economy of Europe =

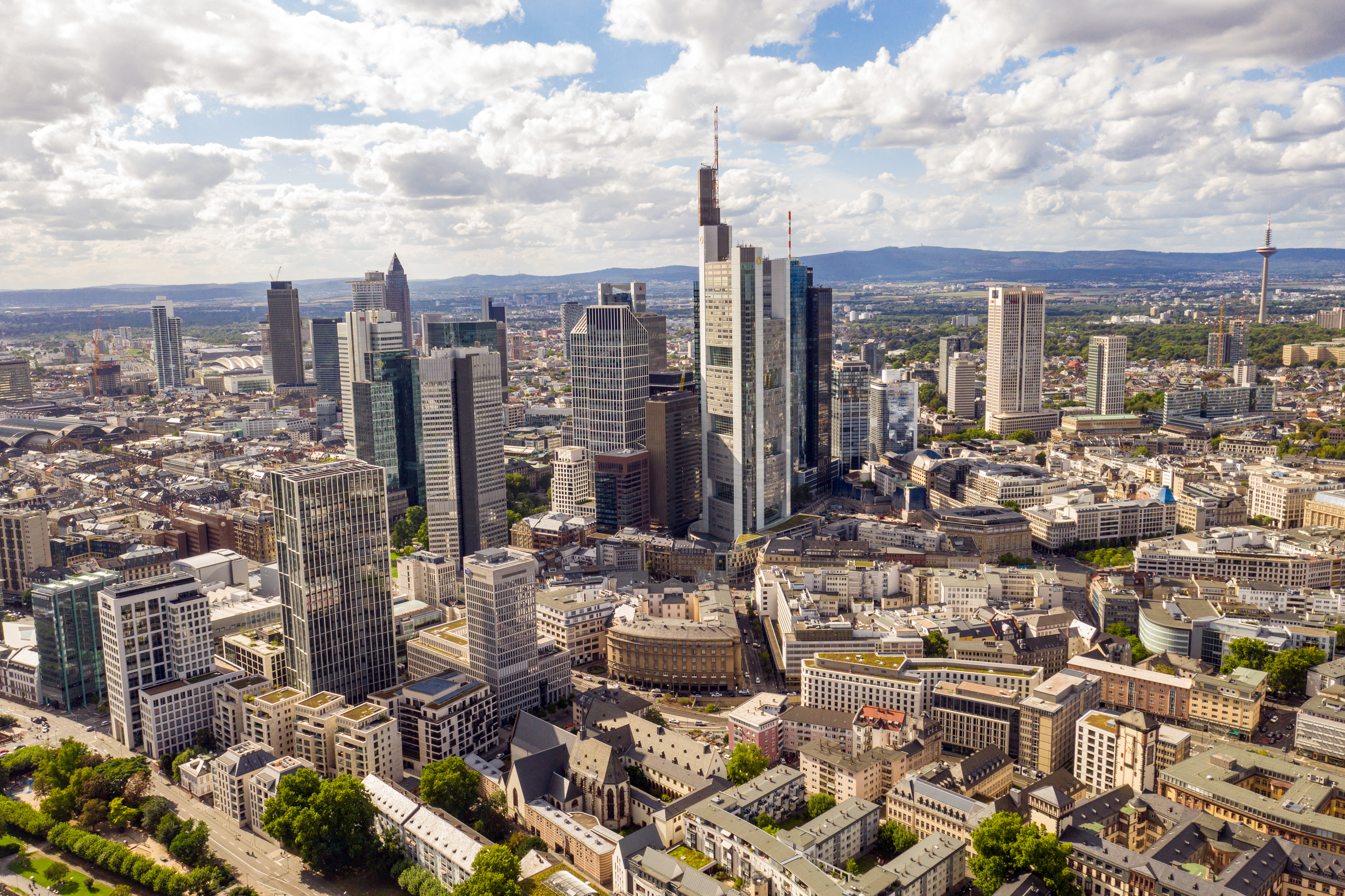
- Germany, the largest European economy, maintains its economic centre in Frankfurt

Statistics
- Population: ▲745 million (2025)
- GDP: ▲$34.480 trillion (nominal; 2026); ▲$49.350 trillion (PPP; 2026)
- GDP rank: 3rd (nominal; 2025); 2nd (PPP; 2025)
- GDP growth: ▲1.6% (2025); ▼1.3% (2026f)
- GDP per capita: ▲$43,760 (nominal; 2026); ▲$66,640 (PPP; 2026)
- GDP per capita rank: 3rd (nominal; 2025); 2nd (PPP; 2025)
- Inflation (CPI): ▲2.6% (2026)
- Millionaires (US$): 16.7 million (2022)

Public finance
- Government debt: ▲78.2% of GDP (2026f)
- Most numbers are from the International Monetary Fund. IMF Europe Datasets All values, unless otherwise stated, are in US dollars.

The continent of Europe has a developed mixed economy, spanning 44 countries with over 745 million citizens. It is the world's third-largest continental economy by nominal gross domestic product (GDP) and the second-largest by purchasing power parity (PPP) GDP. Most of the region is economically integrated through the European Union (EU) and its monetary union, the Eurozone. It is also interconnected through the European single market. Europe's largest national economies by nominal GDP are Germany, the United Kingdom, France, Italy, Russia, Spain, the Netherlands, Poland, and Switzerland. As measured by PPP GDP, the Russian economy is largest, followed by Germany, France, and the United Kingdom; the latter and former of whom circulate non-euro currencies.

There are differences in wealth across Europe which can be seen roughly along the former Cold War divide. The European economy is considered very highly developed with most European states maintaining a GDP per capita higher than the global average. The banking system in Europe maintains over $50 trillion in assets with global managed assets exceeding $20 trillion. London and Paris are by far the economically strongest cities in Europe, each with an GDP exceeding $1 trillion. The two cities are major economic hubs in Europe, with the London Stock Exchange and Euronext Paris, the two largest stock exchanges in Europe by market cap.

== Economic development ==
Real GDP per capita development in Europe, 1820 to 2018

=== Pre-1945: Industrial growth ===
Prior to World War II, Europe's major financial and industrial states were the United Kingdom, France and Germany. The Industrial Revolution, which began in Britain, spread rapidly across Europe, and before long the entire continent was at a high level of industry. World War I briefly led to the industries of some European states stalling, but in the run-up to World War II Europe recovered well and was competing with the ever-increasing economic might of the United States of America.

However, World War II caused the destruction of most of Europe's industrial centres and much of the continent's infrastructure was laid to waste.

=== 1945–1992: The Cold War era ===
Following World War II, European governments were in tatters. Many non-Socialist European governments moved to integrate their economies, laying the foundation for what would become the European Union. This meant a huge increase in shared infrastructure and cross-border trade. Whilst these European states rapidly improved their economies, by the 1980s, the state-run economies of the COMECON group were struggling, mainly due to the massive cost of the Cold War. The GDP and the living standards of Central and Eastern European states were lower than in other parts of Europe.

The European Community grew from 6 original members following World War II, to 12 in this period.

Average living standards in Europe rose significantly during the post-war period, as characterised by these findings:

Per capita private consumption (PPSs) in 1980

- Luxembourg: 5495
- France: 5395
- Germany, Federal Republic: 5319
- Belgium: 5143
- Denmark: 4802
- Netherlands: 4792
- United Kingdom: 4343
- Italy: 4288
- Ireland: 3029

Per capita personal disposable income (PPSs) in 1980

- Belgium: 6202
- France: 6044
- Germany, Federal Republic: 5661
- Netherlands: 5490
- Italy: 5378
- Denmark: 4878
- United Kingdom (UK): 4698

=== Rise of the European Union ===
When the 'Eastern Bloc' dissolved around 1992, these states struggled to adapt to free-market systems. There was, however, a huge variation in degrees of success, with Central European states such as the Czech Republic, Hungary, Slovakia, Slovenia and Poland adapting reasonably quickly, whilst states that used to form the USSR such as Russia, Belarus and Ukraine struggled to reform their crumbling infrastructures.

Many developed European countries were quick to develop economic ties with fellow European states, where democracy was reintroduced. After the Revolutions of 1989, states in Central Europe and the Baltic states dealt with change, former Yugoslavian republics descended into war and Russia, Ukraine and Belarus are still struggling with their old systems.

Europe's largest economy, Germany, struggled upon unification in 1991 with former communist German Democratic Republic, or East Germany, influenced by the Soviet Union. The GDR had much of its industrial infrastructure removed during the Cold War, and for many years unified Germany struggled to build infrastructure in the former East Germany up to the level of former West Germany.

Peace did not come to Yugoslavia for a decade, and by 2003, there were still many NATO and EU peacekeeping troops present in Bosnia and Herzegovina, North Macedonia, and Kosovo. War severely hampered economic growth, with only Slovenia making any real progress in the 1990s.

The European economy was affected by the September 11 Attacks in the United States in 2001, with Germany, Switzerland, France, and the United Kingdom being the worst hit. But, in 2002/2003, the economy began to recover from the attacks in US.

The total size of the economy of Europe was by this time dominated by the EU, a union with then 15 of Europe's states as full members. EU membership was seen as something to aspire to, and the EU gave significant support and aid to those Central and Eastern European states willing to work towards achieving economies that met the entry criteria. During this time, 12 of the 15 members of the EU became part of the Eurozone, a currency union launched in 1999, whereby each member uses a shared currency, the euro, which replaced their former national currencies. Three states chose to remain outside the Eurozone and continue with their own currencies, namely Denmark, Sweden and the United Kingdom.

=== 2004–2007: EU expansion ===
In early 2004, 10 mostly former communist states joined the EU in its biggest ever expansion, enlarging the union to 25 members, with another eight making associated trade agreements. The acceding countries are bound to join the Eurozone and adopt the common currency euro in the future. The process includes the European Exchange Rate Mechanism, of which some of these countries are already part.

Most European economies are in very good shape, and the continental economy reflects this. Conflict and unrest in some of the former Yugoslavia states and in the Caucasus states are hampering economic growth in those states, however.

=== 2008–2015: Eurozone expansion and European debt crisis ===
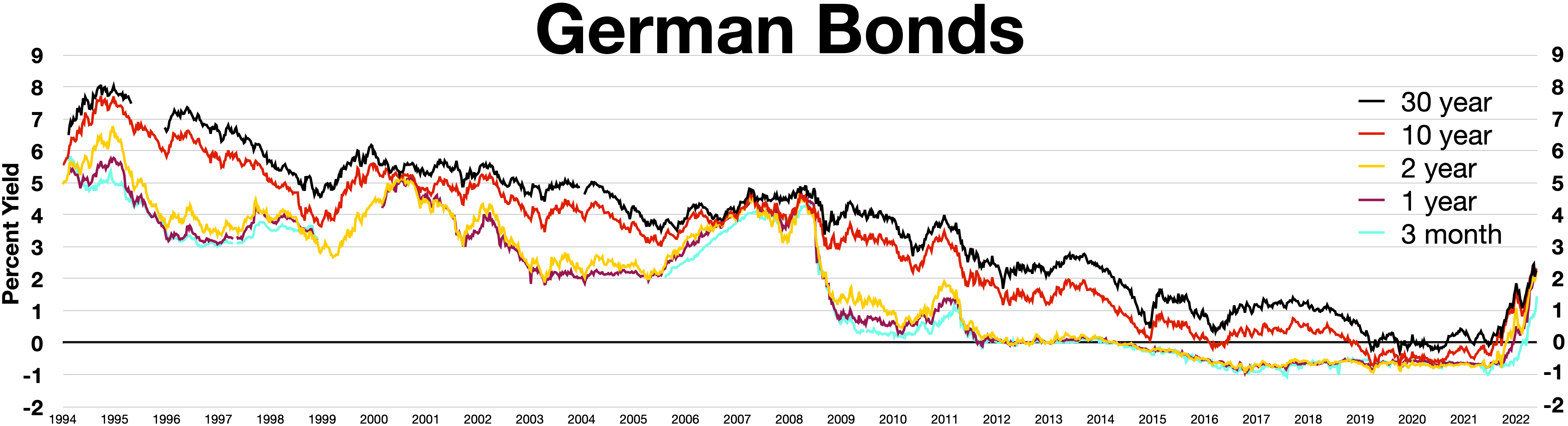
German bonds Inverted yield curve in 2008 and negative interest rates, 2014-2022 30 year 10 year 2 year 1 year 3 month

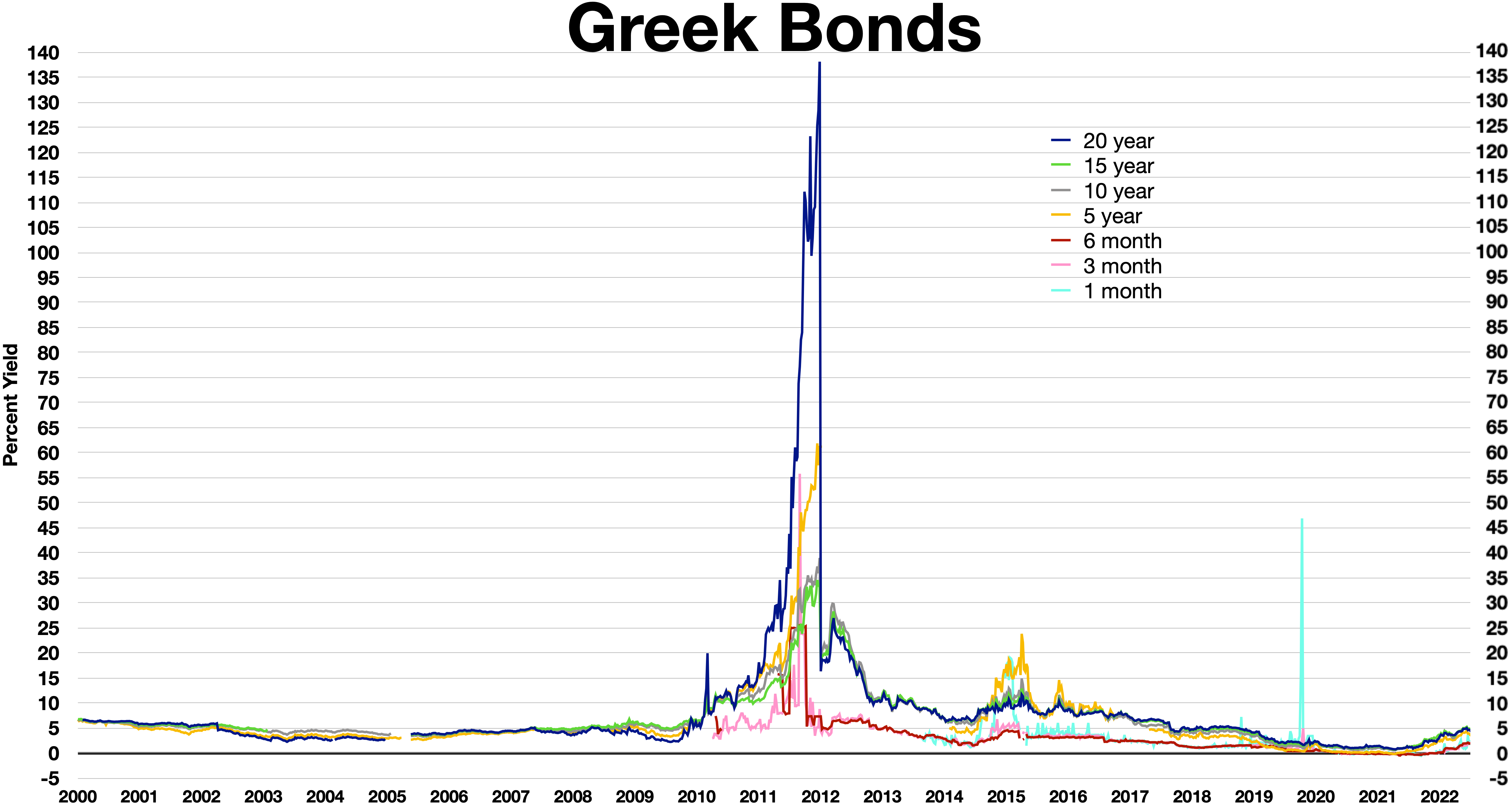
Greek bonds 20 year 15 year 10 year 5 year 1 year 3 month 1 month

Slovenia became the first republic from the former Yugoslavia as well as the first formerly communist nation overall to adopt the EU currency, the euro, in 2007, followed by Malta and Cyprus in 2008, and Slovakia in 2009. In 2011, Estonia became the first republic from the former Soviet Union to adopt the euro, followed by Latvia in 2014, and Lithuania in 2015. In 2013, Croatia became the 28th member of the European Union.

The 2008 financial crisis, triggered by the housing bubble in the United States, caused a significant decline in the GDP of the majority of the European economies, which was a precedent to the euro area crisis, which threatened the collapse of economies in the south, particularly Greece, Portugal and Spain. Having also been hit hard, Ireland exited the crisis in mid-2013. Meanwhile, increased bailouts of the International Monetary Fund and European Central Bank alleviated somehow the situation in the debt-stricken nations, with Central and East European economies led by Germany escaping the worst of the 2010s debt crisis.

By the mid-2010s, Ireland was recovering at a steady pace, having successfully graduated from its bailout programme. The Eurozone as a whole had become more stable; however, problems in Greece and a slow recovery in Italy and Iberia (Spain and Portugal) continued to keep growth in the Euro area to a minimum. Germany continued to lead Europe in stability and growth, while both the UK and Ireland saw strong growth of 3–4%. Unemployment in Ireland fell at the fastest rate in Europe, dropping from double digits in 2011 to an expected 8% by 2016. The Czech Republic and Germany consistently maintained the lowest unemployment rates in the EU. During this period, the growth outlook generally remained optimistic for Europe, with positive growth expected across the Euro area. Although uncertainty still surrounded Greece and debt payments in the Greek state, conditions appeared stable at the time.

European businesses have been in decline against worldwide ones since the crisis. Of the 50 most valuable global firms, only seven were European as of 2015, compared to 17 in 2006. Out of 24 economic sectors, Europe only leads in one - food, which is led by Nestlé from Switzerland. Companies like HSBC, Vodafone, TotalEnergies and BNP Paribas have all also sled in their respective industries against American and Asian competitors. In addition, former technologic heavyweights like Nokia, Ericsson and Alcatel have also declined against evolving American companies in the Silicon Valley.

While the bottom 80% of the European population's income has increased by an estimated 40% on average since 1980, the top 1%'s pre-tax income has more than doubled. Employment in the European Union reached a new high in 2019.

While many social and economic indicators have converged across EU regions, the 2008 financial crisis resulted in a sharp divergence in unemployment rates. Recently, these ranged from less than 2% in Prague to more than 20% in parts of Greece, southern Spain, and southern Italy. Rapid technological change also had an effect on medium-skilled workers resulting in more low-skilled jobs being taken up.

=== 2016–present: Brexit, COVID pandemic and Russian invasion of Ukraine ===
In 2016, the United Kingdom became the first nation to vote to leave the European Union since its modern iteration in the post-Cold War era, reducing the number of the said bloc's membership down to 27 member states for the time being. U.K.'s exit prolonged the country's ongoing economic recession beyond the COVID pandemic era in the 2020s decade. In 2022, the Russian war on Ukraine prompted both Ukraine and Moldova to be granted immediate candidate status by the European Union for economic and security reasons, with Bosnia and Herzegovina and Georgia following suit by the end of the following year. In 2024, Finland and Sweden became the newest members of the NATO. Croatia and Bulgaria joined the Eurozone after officially adopting the euro by 2023 and 2026, respectively.

== Regional variation ==
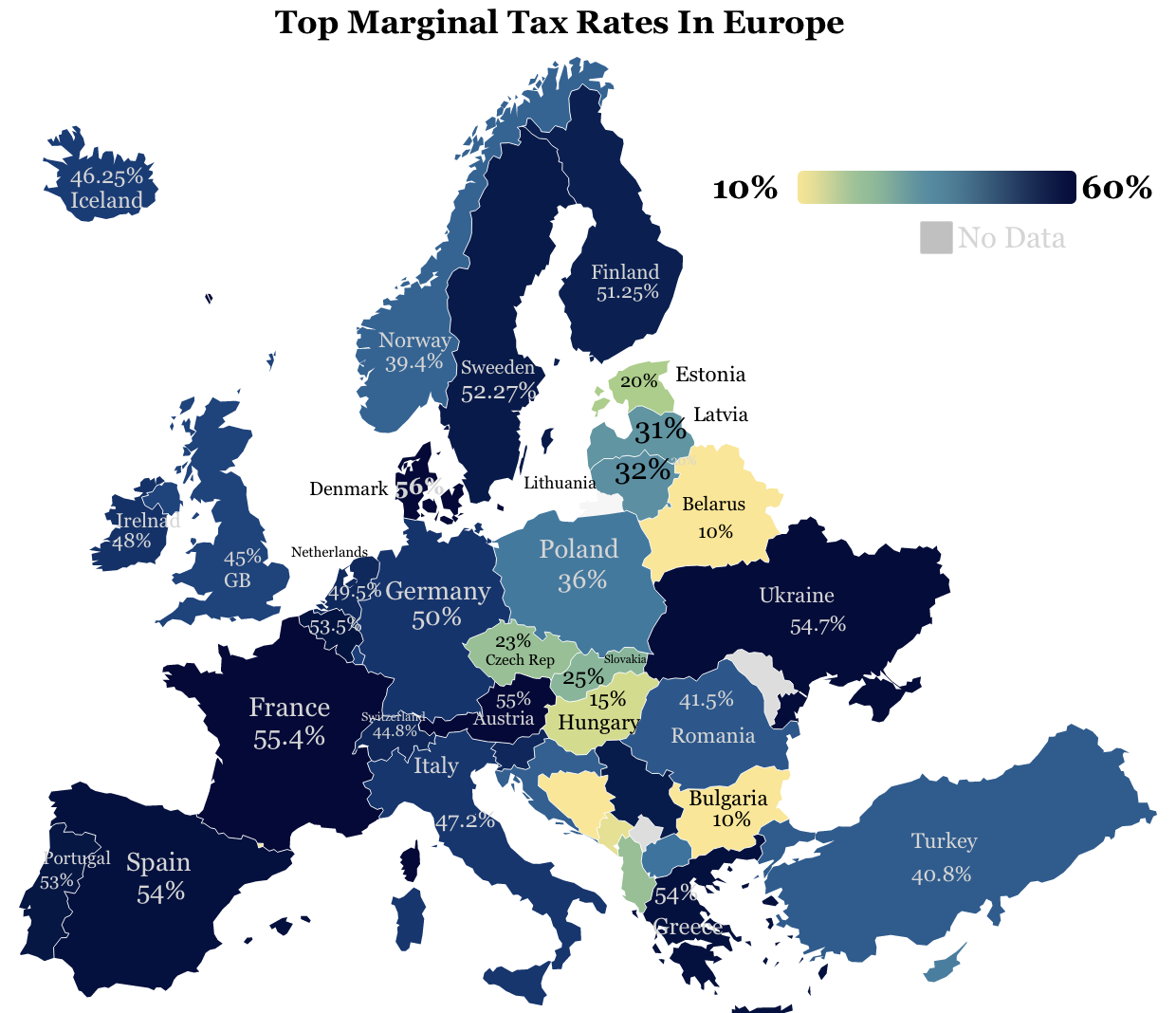
Top Marginal Tax Rates In Europe 2022

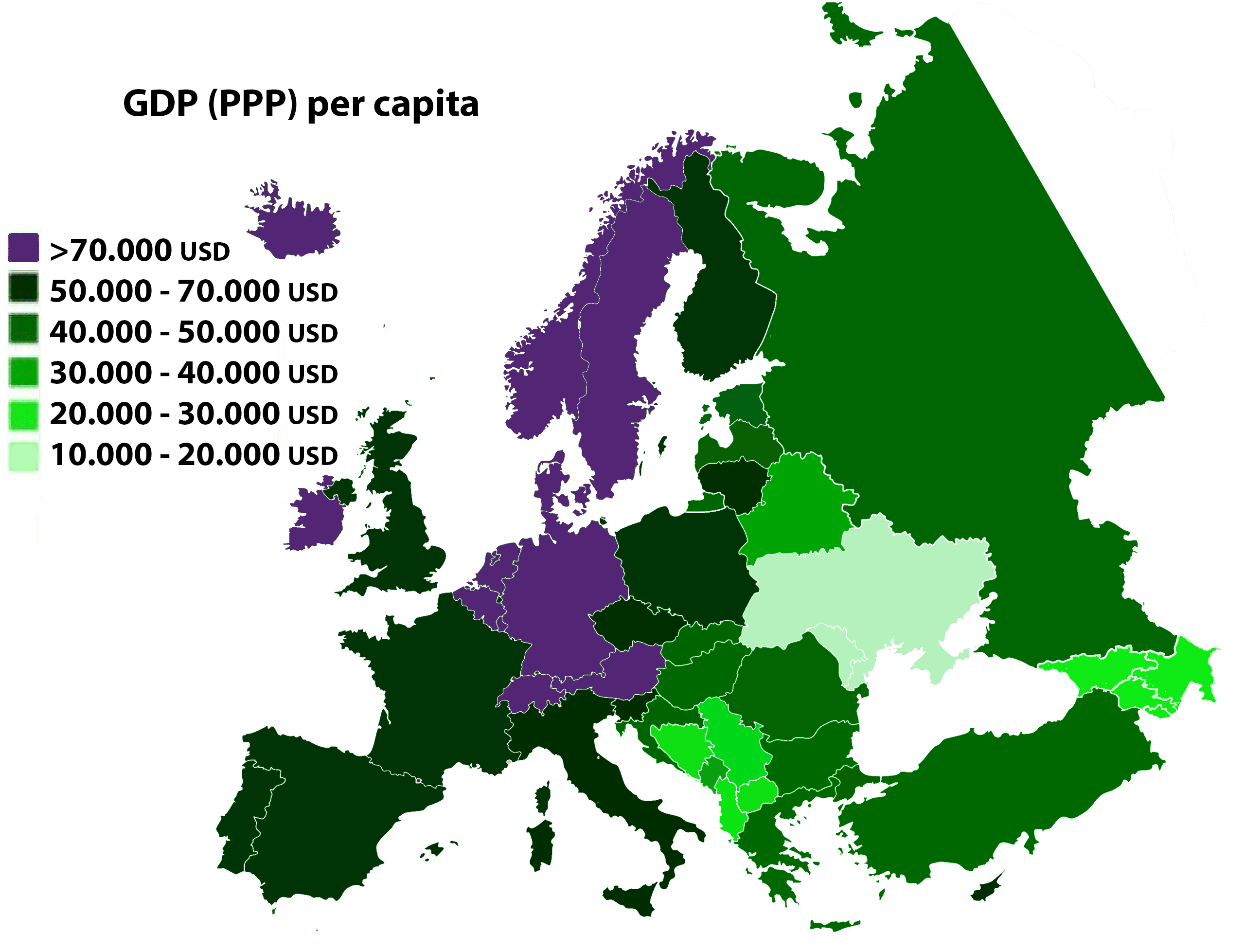
European and bordering nations by GDP (PPP) per capita

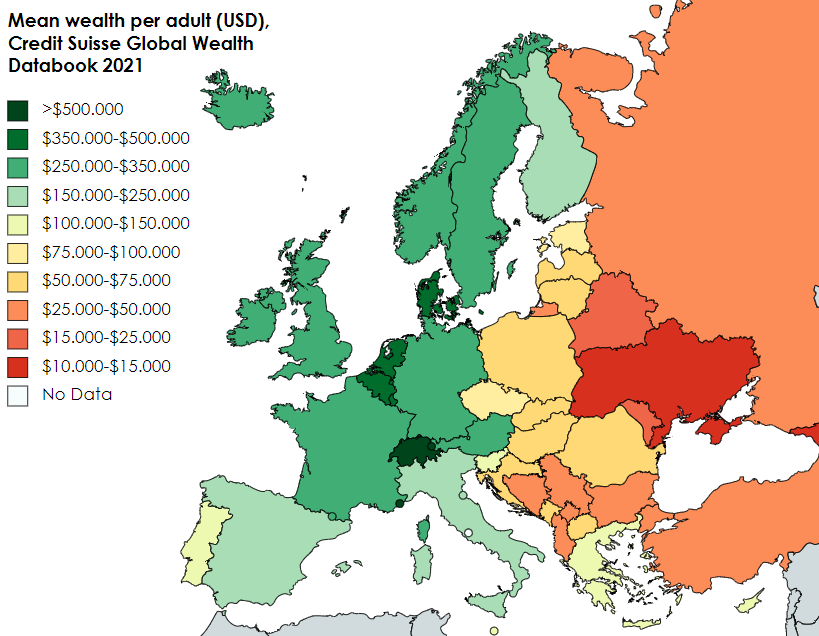
European countries by mean wealth per adult (USD), Credit Suisse Global Wealth Datebook 2021

European countries with a long history of trade, a free market system, and a high level of development in the previous century are generally in the north and west of the continent. They tend to be wealthier and more stable than countries congregated in the European East and South, even though the gap is converging, especially in Central and Eastern Europe, due to higher growth rates.

The poorest states are those that just emerged from communism, fascist dictatorships and civil wars, namely those of the former Soviet Union and Yugoslavia, with some exceptions. Former Western Bloc itself presents some living standards and development differences, with the greatest contrast seen between the Nordics (Norway, Denmark, Sweden, Finland) and Greece, Portugal, Spain and Italy.

Below is a map of European countries by gross national income per capita. High income in blue ($12,616 or more, as defined by the World Bank), upper middle income in green ($4,086 – $12,615) and lower middle income ($1,036 – $4,085) in yellow.

The predicted impact of the COVID-19 pandemic on GDP is greatest in Southern Europe, where structural improvements are expected to enhance GDP levels by up to 5% by 2030, with the effect decreasing to 2.5% by 2040. The effect is projected to be a little less than 1% in Western Europe and Northern Europe, with cross-border spillover effects from the rest of Europe accounting for half of the predicted impact.

A survey conducted in 2021 found that many businesses cut back on operations as a result of the COVID-19 epidemic, resulting in a significant decline in revenue and job changes. Due to the pandemic, over 40% of the businesses surveyed had to close temporarily. Sales in the region declined by roughly 25% on average, but there was substantial variation within sub-regions.

One out of every five businesses launched or grew their online business or distribution of products and services, while one out of every four businesses started or increased their remote operations.

The pandemic has also hastened corporate transformation, with over 30% of companies altering or transforming their output as a result of it. Chemical manufacturers and wholesalers were the first to respond, with one in three expanding online business activity, beginning or boosting delivery of products and services, increasing remote employment, and changing manufacturing.

Economic activity decreased by almost 4% in the majority of sub-regions in 2020, which was similar to the global average of 3.2%. However, the variance between nations is prominent. The high infection and mortality rates of the pandemic in countries in the Western Balkans, the Eastern Neighbourhood, and Central and Eastern Europe meant they faced deeper recessions.

=== European Union ===
The European Union has the second largest economy in the world, behind that of the United States. Trade within the Union accounts for more than one-third of the world total.

The European Union or EU is a supranational union of 27 European states, the most recent acceding member being Croatia, which became full member on 1 July 2013. It has many functions, the most important being the establishment and maintenance of a common single market, consisting of a customs union, a single currency (adopted by 21 of the 27 member states), a Common Agricultural Policy and a Common Fisheries Policy. The European Union also undertakes various initiatives to co-ordinate activities of the member states.

The union has evolved over time from a primarily economic union to an increasingly political one. This trend is highlighted by the increasing number of policy areas that fall within EU competence: political power has tended to shift upwards from the Member States to the EU.

=== European Free Trade Association ===
The European Free Trade Association (EFTA) was established on 3 May 1960 as an alternative for European states that did not wish to join the European Union, creating a trade bloc with fewer central powers.

The EFTA member states as of 1992 were Austria, Denmark, Finland, Iceland, Liechtenstein, Norway, Sweden and Switzerland. In 2014 only four countries, Iceland, Norway, Switzerland and Liechtenstein, remained members of EFTA, as the other members have gradually left to join the EU.

=== European Economic Area ===
The European Economic Area (EEA) came into being on 1 January 1994 following an agreement between the European Free Trade Association (EFTA) and the European Union (EU). It was designed to enable EFTA countries to participate in the European Single Market without having to join the EU. In a referendum, Switzerland chose not to participate in the EEA (although it is linked to the European Union by bilateral agreements similar in content to the EEA agreement), so the current members are the EU states plus Norway, Iceland and Liechtenstein.

A Joint Committee consisting of the non EU members plus the European Commission (representing the EU) has the function of extending relevant EU Law to the non EU members.

=== Commonwealth of Independent States ===
The Commonwealth of Independent States (CIS) is an organization consisting of 11 of the 12 successors to the Soviet Union. The Commonwealth of Independent States (CIS) was founded by an Agreement on the creation the Commonwealth of Independent States signed on 8 December 1991 by Russia, Belarus and Ukraine. According to Article 7, the High Contracting Parties indicate that through common coordinating institutions, their joint activities will consist in coordinating foreign policy activities, cooperation in the formation and development of a common economic space, common European and Eurasian markets, in the field of customs policy, in the field of customs policy, in the development of transport and communication systems, cooperation in the field of environmental protection, migration policy and the fight against organized crime.

On 24 September 1993, at a meeting of the Commonwealth of Independent States (CIS) Council of Heads of State in Moscow, Azerbaijan, Armenia, Belarus, Kazakhstan, Kyrgyzstan, Moldova, Russia, Tajikistan, Uzbekistan signed the Treaty on the creation of an Economic Union which reinforces by an international agreement the intention to create an economic union through the step-by-step creation of a free trade area, a customs union and conditions for the free movement of goods, services, capital and labor. All these countries have ratified the Treaty and it entered into force on January 14, 1994.

On 15 April 1994, at a meeting of the Commonwealth of Independent States (CIS) Council of Heads of State in Moscow, all 12 post-Soviet states signed the international Agreement on the Establishment of a Free Trade Area in order to move towards the creation of an economic union. Article 17 also confirmed the intention to conclude a free trade agreement in services.

In October 2011, the new Commonwealth of Independent States Treaty on Free Trade Area was signed by eight of the eleven CIS prime ministers; Armenia, Belarus, Kazakhstan, Kyrgyzstan, Moldova, Russia, Tajikistan, and Ukraine at a meeting in St. Petersburg.

After 11 years of negotiations, on 8 June 2023, in Sochi, Armenia, Belarus, Kazakhstan, Kyrgyzstan, Russia, Tajikistan and Uzbekistan signed the Commonwealth of Independent States Agreement on Free Trade in Services, Establishment, Operations and Investment to partly integrate Uzbekistan and Tajikistan on the common standards of the WTO (General Agreement on Trade in Services) and the EAEU (some provisions were borrowed from EAEU law) even without their membership in the WTO (Uzbekistan) or the EAEU (Uzbekistan and Tajikistan).

The Information and Analytical Department of the CIS Executive Committee notes in October 2023 that at the moment a kind of pyramid of integration entities has developed in the CIS countries, differing in the depth of economic integration (multi-speed integration), and the implementation of free trade agreements and a number of other documents will lead to the formation of a full-fledged common economic space within the Commonwealth. Within its participant countries, state borders will cease to be an obstacle to the free movement of goods, services, labor and capital.

On 6 March 2024, representatives of Armenia, Belarus, Kazakhstan, Kyrgyzstan, Russia, Tajikistan, Uzbekistan and the CIS Executive Committee finalized the work on updating the Concept of Phased Formation of a Common Labor Market and Regulation of Labor Force Migration. On 29 November 2024, the CIS finally adopted an updated Concept for the phased formation of a common labor market and migration regulation.

In the International Comparison Program 2021, the Commonwealth of Independent States (CIS) region was linked through the standard global core list approach, unlike in ICP 2017. Based on the results, the World Bank announced that in 2021 Russia was the world's 4th largest economy (int$5.7 trillion and 3.8 percent of the world) and the largest economy in Europe and Central Asia when measured in PPP terms (15 percent of the regional total), followed by Germany (13 percent of the regional economy).

=== Central European Free Trade Agreement ===
The Central European Free Trade Agreement (CEFTA) is a trade bloc of: Albania, Bosnia and Herzegovina, North Macedonia, Moldova, Montenegro, Serbia and the United Nations Interim Administration Mission in Kosovo (UNMIK) on behalf of Kosovo.

== Currency and central banks ==
=== Eurozone ===

The currency of the euro area is the euro, and its central bank is the European Central Bank. Each country of the area has a National Central Bank that participates in the Eurosystem.

Country	Currency	National Central Bank	Pegged with
Austria	Euro	Oesterreichische Nationalbank	float
Belgium	Euro	National Bank of Belgium	float
Bulgaria	Euro	Bulgarian National Bank	float
Croatia	Euro	Croatian National Bank	float
Cyprus	Euro	Central Bank of Cyprus	float
Estonia	Euro	Bank of Estonia	float
Finland	Euro	Bank of Finland	float
France	Euro	Bank of France	float
Germany	Euro	Deutsche Bundesbank	float
Greece	Euro	Bank of Greece	float
Ireland	Euro	Central Bank of Ireland	float
Italy	Euro	Bank of Italy	float
Latvia	Euro	Bank of Latvia	float
Lithuania	Euro	Bank of Lithuania	float
Luxembourg	Euro	Central Bank of Luxembourg	float
Malta	Euro	Central Bank of Malta	float
Netherlands	Euro	De Nederlandsche Bank	float
Portugal	Euro	Banco de Portugal	float
Slovakia	Euro	National Bank of Slovakia	float
Slovenia	Euro	Bank of Slovenia	float
Spain	Euro	Bank of Spain	float

Four European microstates participate in the euro area through monetary agreements with the EU, granting them the rights to produce limited quantities of euro coins with their own design on the national side, but not to issue euro banknotes. These countries' financial authorities, whether named central banks or not, are primarily supervisory authorities.

- Andorra: Andorran Financial Authority
- Monaco: Commission de Contrôle des Activités Financières
- San Marino: Central Bank of San Marino
- Vatican City: Institute for the Works of Religion

Two additional countries have adopted the euro unilaterally, and are not technically part of the euro area even though they use the euro as their currency.

- Kosovo: Central Bank of Kosovo
- Montenegro: Central Bank of Montenegro

=== Non-Eurozone currencies ===
Country	Currency	Central bank	Pegged with
Albania	Albanian lek	Bank of Albania	
Armenia	Armenian Dram	Central Bank of Armenia	
Azerbaijan	Azerbaijani Manat	Central Bank of Azerbaijan	
Belarus	Belarusian rubel	National Bank of the Republic of Belarus	
Bosnia and Herzegovina	Bosnia and Herzegovina convertible mark	Central Bank of Bosnia and Herzegovina	1 EUR = 1.95583 BAM
Czech Republic	Czech koruna	Czech National Bank	
Denmark	Danish krone	Danmarks Nationalbank	1 EUR = 7.46038 DDK (ERM II)
Georgia	Georgian Lari	National Bank of Georgia	
Hungary	Hungarian forint	Hungarian National Bank	
Kazakhstan	Kazakh tenge	National Bank of Kazakhstan	
Poland	Polish złoty	National Bank of Poland	
Russia	Russian rouble	Bank of Russia	
Romania	Romanian leu	National Bank of Romania	
Serbia	Serbian dinar	National Bank of Serbia	
Liechtenstein	Swiss franc	Liechtensteinische Landesbank	float
Switzerland	Swiss franc	Swiss National Bank	float
Sweden	Swedish krona	Sveriges Riksbank	float
North Macedonia	Macedonian denar	National Bank of North Macedonia	1 EUR = 61,5 MKD
Norway	Norwegian krone	Norges Bank	float
Moldova	Moldovan leu	National Bank of Moldova	
United Kingdom (Note: In addition to the UK itself, the British Crown Dependencies of Guernsey, Isle of Man, Jersey and a British Overseas Territory of Gibraltar are the other pound sterling users in Europe. All four issue local versions of the pound sterling which are pegged with GBP. The British military bases in Cyprus (Akrotiri and Dhekelia) use the euro.)	Sterling	Bank of England	float
Ukraine	Ukrainian hryvnia	National Bank of Ukraine	float
Iceland	Icelandic króna	Central Bank of Iceland	float
Turkey	Turkish lira	Central Bank of the Republic of Turkey	float

== Stock exchanges ==
Country	Group	Stock exchange	City	Founded	Listings	Technology	Operating MIC
Pan-European	SIX Group	Aquis Stock Exchange	London	2012	87	Aquis Technologies	AQSE
Pan-European	Cboe	Cboe Europe	London	2007		Cboe Titanium	CCXE
Pan-European	Euronext	Euronext Amsterdam	Amsterdam	1602	3761	OPTIQ	XAMS
Pan-European	Euronext	Euronext Athens	Athens	1876	3761	OPTIQ	XATH
Pan-European	Euronext	Euronext Brussels	Brussels	1801	3761	OPTIQ	XBRU
Pan-European	Euronext	Euronext Dublin	Dublin	1793	3761	OPTIQ	XDUB
Pan-European	Euronext	Euronext Lisbon	Lisbon	1769	3761	OPTIQ	XLIS
Pan-European	Euronext	Borsa Italiana	Milan	1808	3761	OPTIQ	XMIL
Pan-European	Euronext	Oslo Stock Exchange	Oslo	1819	3761	OPTIQ	XOSL
Pan-European	Euronext	Euronext Paris	Paris	1724	3761	OPTIQ	XPAR
Pan-European	Nasdaq Baltic	Nasdaq Vilnius	Vilnius	1992	Main: 51; MTF: 19	INET Nordic	XLIT
Pan-European	Nasdaq Baltic	Nasdaq Riga	Riga	1993	Main: 51; MTF: 19	INET Nordic	XRIS
Pan-European	Nasdaq Baltic	Nasdaq Tallinn	Tallinn	1995	Main: 51; MTF: 19	INET Nordic	XTAL
Pan-European	Nasdaq Nordic	Nasdaq Copenhagen	Copenhagen	1808	Main: 698; FNGM: 476	INET Nordic	XCSE
Pan-European	Nasdaq Nordic	Nasdaq Stockholm	Stockholm	1863	Main: 698; FNGM: 476	INET Nordic	XSTO
Pan-European	Nasdaq Nordic	Nasdaq Helsinki	Helsinki	1912	Main: 698; FNGM: 476	INET Nordic	XHEL
Pan-European	Nasdaq Nordic	Nasdaq Iceland	Reykjavík	1985	Main: 698; FNGM: 476	INET Nordic	XICE
Albania		Tirana Stock Exchange	Tirana	1996	4		XTIR
Armenia	Warsaw Stock Exchange	Armenia Stock Exchange	Yerevan	2001			XAMX
Austria		Wiener Börse	Vienna	1771	63	T7	XWBO
Azerbaijan		Baku Stock Exchange	Baku	2000	27		BSEX
Belarus		Belarusian Currency and Stock Exchange	Minsk	1998			BCSE
Bosnia and Herzegovina		Sarajevo Stock Exchange	Sarajevo	2001			XSSE
Bosnia and Herzegovina		Banja Luka Stock Exchange	Banja Luka	2001			XBLB
Bulgaria		Bulgarian Stock Exchange	Sofia	1914		T7	XBUL
Guernsey		The International Stock Exchange	Guernsey	2013	4000		TISE
Croatia		Zagreb Stock Exchange	Zagreb	1907	118	T7	XZAG
Cyprus		Cyprus Stock Exchange	Nicosia	1996			XCYS
Czech Republic	Wiener Börse	Prague Stock Exchange	Prague	1871	29	T7	XPRA
Faroe Islands		Faroese Securities Market	Tórshavn	2004			VMFX
Georgia		Georgian Stock Exchange	Tbilisi	1999	261		XGSE
Germany		Berliner Börse	Berlin	1685	29461	Xontro, Equiduct	XBER
Germany		Börse Düsseldorf	Düsseldorf	1853		Xontro	XDUS
Germany		Hamburg Stock Exchange	Hamburg/Hanover	1558		Xontro	XHAM/XHAN
Germany		Börse München	München	1830		MAX-ONE	XMUN
Germany		Börse Stuttgart	Stuttgart	1861		Xitaro	XSTU
Germany	Deutsche Börse	Deutsche Börse Frankfurt	Frankfurt	1585	1555843	T7	XFRA
Germany	Deutsche Börse	Deutsche Börse Xetra	Frankfurt	1997	3580	T7	XETR
Germany		Tradegate Exchange	Berlin	2009	9100		XGAT, XGRM
Gibraltar		Gibraltar Stock Exchange	Gibraltar	2014			GSXL
Hungary		Budapest Stock Exchange	Budapest	1864	61	T7	XBUD
Kazakhstan		Kazakhstan Stock Exchange	Almaty	1993			XKAZ
Kazakhstan		Astana International Exchange	Astana	2017			AIXK
Luxembourg		Luxembourg Stock Exchange	Luxembourg (city)	1927	49,994	OPTIQ	XLUX
Malta		Malta Stock Exchange	Valletta	1992	320	T7	XMAL
Moldova		Moldova Stock Exchange	Chișinău	1994			XMOL
Montenegro		Montenegro Stock Exchange	Podgorica	1993			XMNX
Netherlands		Nxchange	Amsterdam	2015	8		XNXC
Netherlands		NPEX	The Hague	2009			NPEX
North Macedonia		Macedonian Stock Exchange	Skopje	1995			XMAE
Poland	Warsaw Stock Exchange	Warsaw Stock Exchange	Warsaw	1817	449	UTP	XWAR
Romania		Bucharest Stock Exchange	Bucharest	1882	83		XBSE
Russia		Moscow Exchange	Moscow	2013 (1992)			MISX
Russia		Saint Petersburg Stock Exchange	Saint Petersburg	1997			SPIM
Serbia		Belgrade Stock Exchange	Belgrade	1894	66		XBEL
Slovakia		Bratislava Stock Exchange	Bratislava	1991			XBRA
Slovenia	Zagreb Stock Exchange	Ljubljana Stock Exchange	Ljubljana	1989	58	T7	XLJU
Spain	SIX Group	Bolsa de Barcelona	Barcelona	1915			BMEX
Spain	SIX Group	Bolsa de Bilbao	Bilbao	1890			BMEX
Spain	SIX Group	Bolsa de Madrid	Madrid	1831			BMEX
Spain	SIX Group	Mercado Oficial Español de Futuros y Opciones	Madrid	1989			BMEX
Spain	SIX Group	Bolsa de Valencia	Valencia	1981			BMEX
Sweden	Börse Stuttgart	Nordic Growth Market	Stockholm	2003	Main: 6 SME: 104	Elasticia	XNGM
Sweden	Spotlight Group	Spotlight Stock Market	Stockholm	1997	138	INET Nordic	XSAT
Switzerland	SIX Group	SIX Swiss Exchange	Zürich	1850	266		XSWX
Switzerland	Börse Stuttgart	BX Swiss	Zürich	1888	18	Elasticia	XBRN
Turkey		Borsa Istanbul	Istanbul	1866	417		XIST
Ukraine		PFTS Ukraine Stock Exchange	Kyiv	2002			PFTS
Ukraine		Ukrainian Exchange	Kyiv	2008	88		XUAX
United Kingdom	LSEG	London Stock Exchange	London	1571	2800	Millennium	XLON

== Economic sectors ==
=== Agriculture and fishing ===
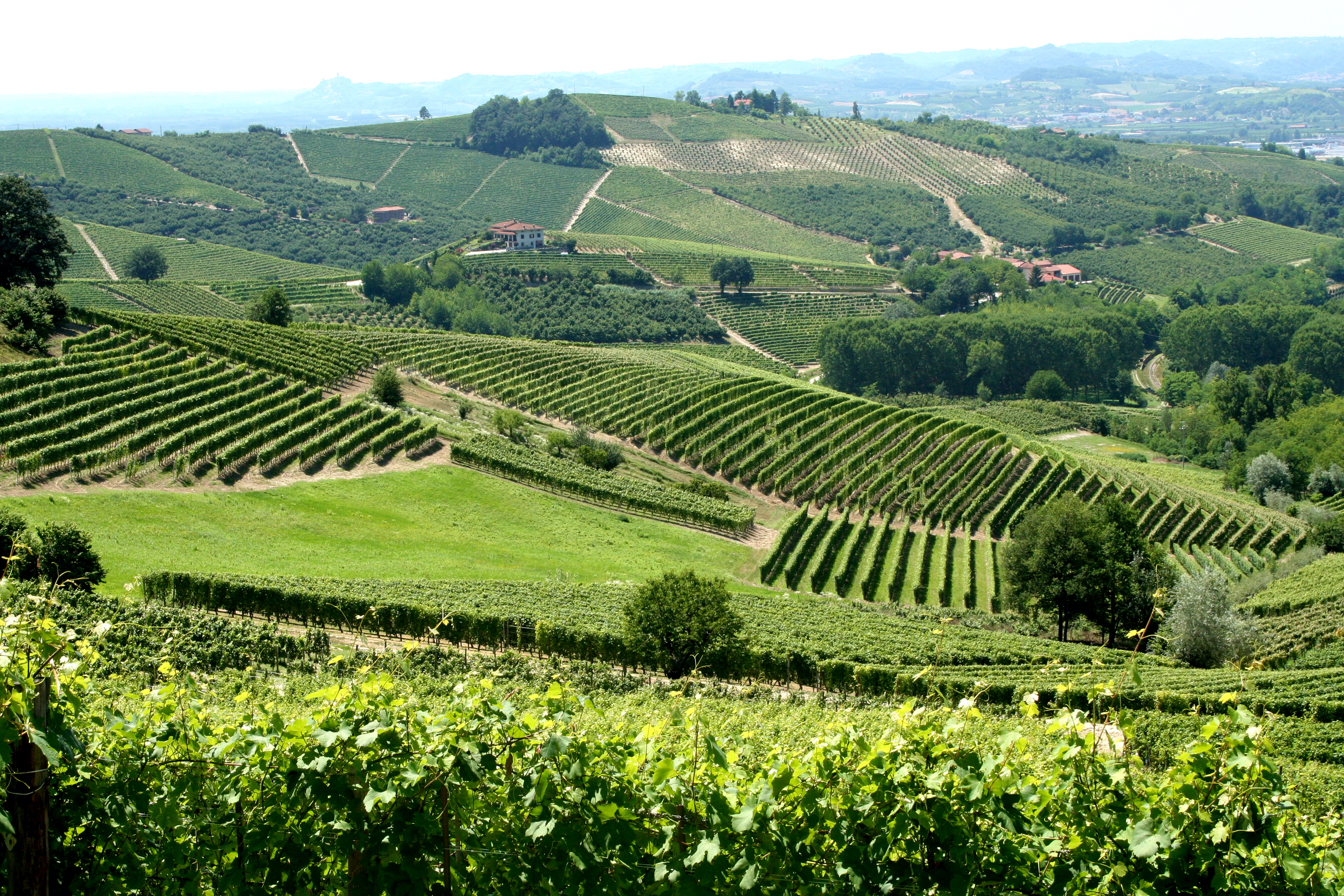
Vineyards in Langhe and Montferrat, Piedmont. Italy is the world's largest wine producer (22% of the global market), as well as the country with the widest variety of indigenous grapevine in the world.

Europe's agricultural sector is in general highly developed and also has the lowest percentage of the population working in agriculture of any continent. The process of improving Central Europe's agriculture is ongoing and is helped by the accession of Central European states to the EU. The agricultural sector in Europe is helped by the Common Agricultural Policy (CAP), which provides farmers with a minimal price for their products and subsidizes their exports, which increases competitiveness for their products. This policy is highly controversial as it hampers free trade worldwide (protectionism sparks protectionism from other countries and trade blocs: the concept of trade wars) and is violating the concept of fair trade.

This means because of the protectionist nature of the CAP, agricultural products from developing countries are rendered uncompetitive in both Europe (an important export market for developing countries) and on their home markets (as European agricultural products are dumped on developing countries' markets with help from European agricultural subsidies). This controversy surrounds every system of agricultural subsidies (the United States' policy of subsidizing farmers is also controversial). The CAP is also controversial because 40% of the EU's budget is spent on it, and because of the overproduction caused by it.

The Common Fisheries Policy is surrounded by an extensive system of rules (mainly consisting of quotas) to protect the environment from overfishing. Despite these rules, the cod is becoming increasingly rare in the North Sea resulting in drastic shortages in countries such as Canada and the United Kingdom. Strict fishing rules are the main reason for Norway and Iceland to stay out of the European Union (and out of the Common Fisheries Policy). Price guarantees and subsidizations of fishermen are implemented in the same way as agricultural subsidies are. Bluefin tuna is also a problem. Global stocks of the species are overfished with extinction in the wild a possibility in the near future. This also has the negative effect of threatening their traditional, natural predators.

=== Manufacturing ===
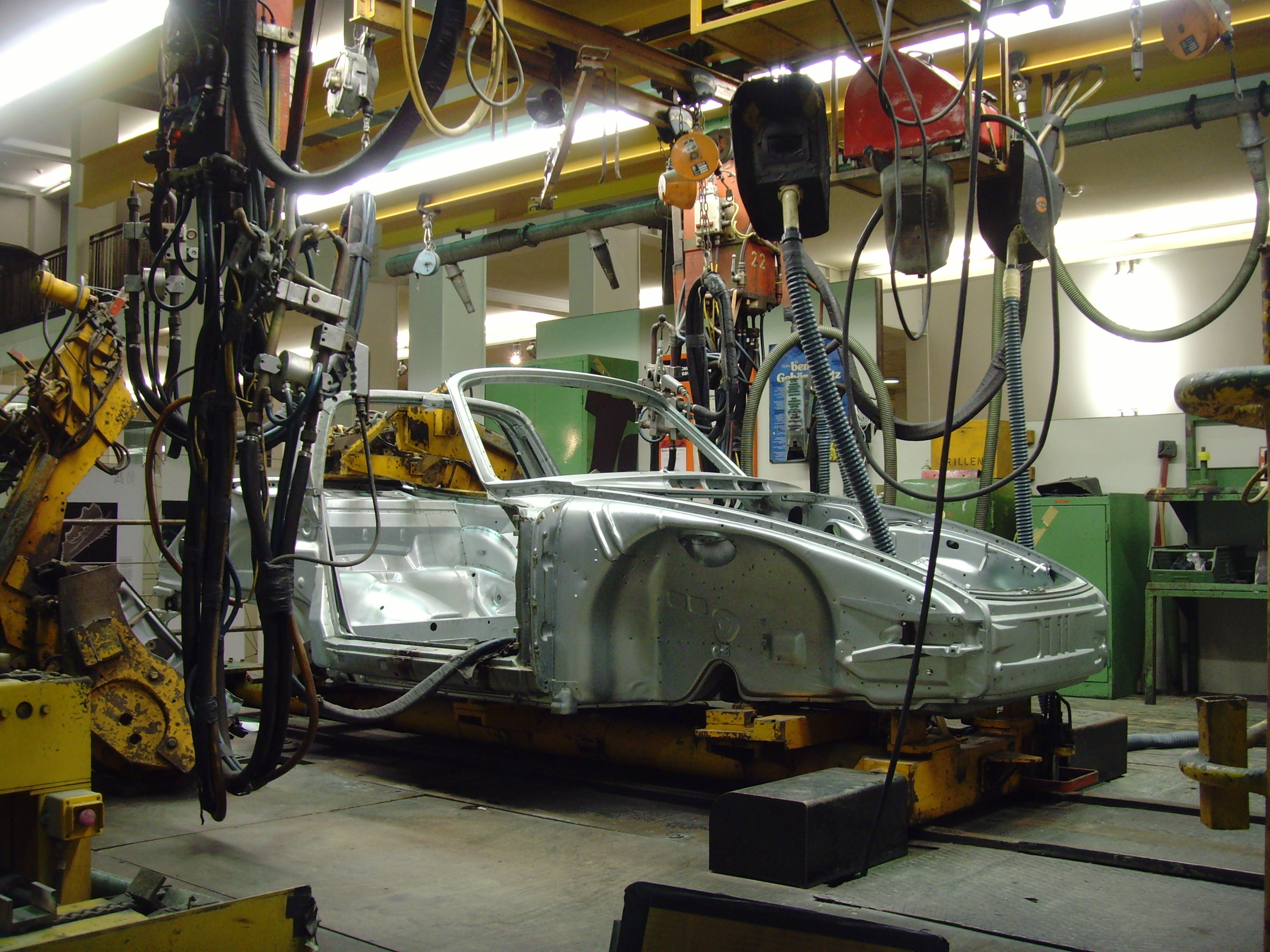
Porsche 911, by Volkswagen, assembly, Mannheim state museum of technology and labour, 2008, Germany, the largest manufacturing economy in Europe.

Europe has a thriving manufacturing sector, with a large part of the world's industrial production taking place in Europe. Most of the continent's industries are concentrated in the 'Blue Banana' (covering Southern England, the Benelux, western Germany, eastern France, Switzerland, and northern Italy). However, because of the higher wage level and hence production costs, Europe is suffering from deindustrialization and offshoring in the labour-intensive manufacturing sectors. This means that manufacturing has become less important and that jobs are moved to regions with cheaper labour costs (mainly China and Central and Eastern Europe).

Central Europe (Berlin, Saxony, the Czech Republic and Little Poland) was largely industrialised by 1850 but Eastern Europe (European Russia) begun industrialisation between 1890–1900 and intensified it during the communist regime (as the USSR), but it suffered from contraction in the 1990s when the inefficient heavy-industry-based manufacturing sector was crippled after the collapse of communism and the introduction of the market economy.

In the 21st century the manufacturing sector in Central and Eastern Europe picked up because of the accession of ten formerly Communist European states to the EU and their resulting accession to the European Common Market. This caused firms within the European Union to move jobs from their manufacturing sector to Central European countries such as Poland (see above), which sparked both Central and Eastern European industrial growth and employment.

Of the top 500 largest corporations by revenue (Fortune Global 500 in 2024), 123 have their headquarters in Europe. Eighty-eight are located in the EU, 17 in the United Kingdom, 11 in Switzerland, five in Russia, one in Turkey, one in Norway. With 29 companies that are part of the world's biggest 500 companies, Germany was in 2024 the most represented European country in the 2024 Fortune Global 500, ahead of France (24 companies) and the UK (17). With 62 companies that are part of the world's biggest 2000 companies, France was again in 2023 the most represented European country in the 2023 Forbes Global 2000, ahead of the UK (60 companies) and Germany (50).

=== Investing and banking ===
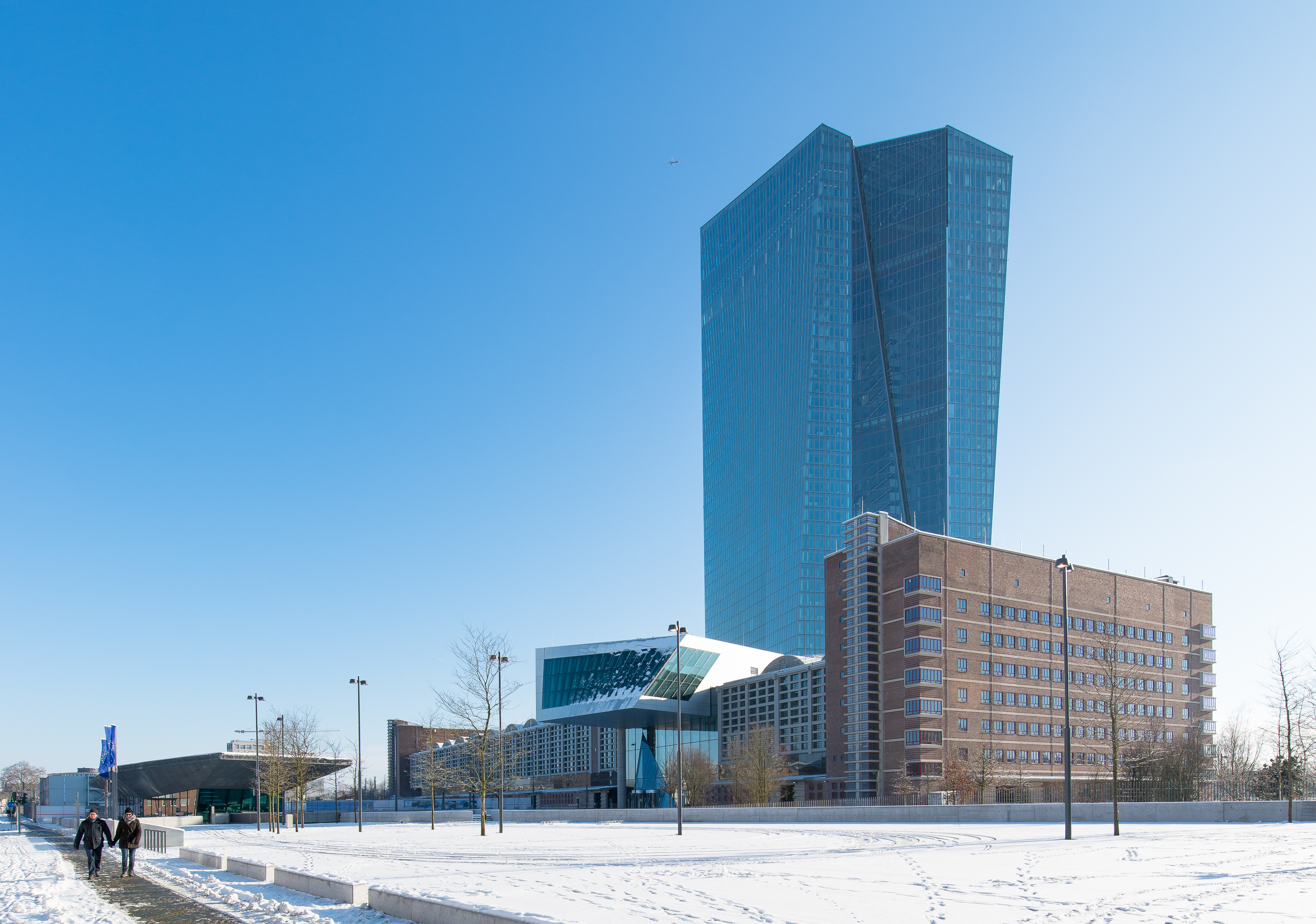
The European Central Bank's main building in Frankfurt, Germany. Frankfurt is a financial centre of Europe.

Europe has a well-developed financial sector. Many European cities are financial centres with London being the largest. The financial sector of the Eurozone is helped by the introduction of the euro as common currency. This has made it easier for European households and firms to invest in companies and deposit money in banks in other European countries. Exchange rate fluctuations are now non-existent in the Eurozone. The financial sector in Central and Eastern Europe is helped by economic growth in the region, European Regional Development Fund and the commitment of Central and Eastern European governments to achieve high standards.

According to the Global Financial Centres Index, as of 19 September 2019, four European cities rank among the 20 largest financial centres in the world: London (2nd), Zurich (14th), Frankfurt (15th), and Paris (17th). European banks are amongst the largest and most profitable in the world, such as HSBC, BNP Paribas, Crédit Agricole, Grupo Santander, Société Générale, Barclays, Groupe BPCE, Deutsche Bank, Intesa Sanpaolo, Lloyds Banking Group, ING Group, Crédit Mutuel, UBS and UniCredit.

At the start of the COVID-19 pandemic in the economy, aggregate investment levels fell in the second quarter of 2020. The corporate sector was the most responsible for this reduction. Investment appeared to be increasing in early 2021, coinciding with the relaxation of COVID-19 restrictions. 30% of EU firms reported in the European Investment Bank's Investment Survey 2021 that they adjusted their investment expectations to fit the COVID-19 pandemic. This is reported as more than the US where the positive revision of investment plans was more common, with 25% of firms reporting. 72% of EU enterprises state that the COVID-19 pandemic will have a long-term influence on investment requirements and priorities.

Businesses in Europe received governmental support following the economic crisis. Governments ensured that enterprises had access to financing, with some governments covering labour expenses so that people could remain employed. This initiative targeted enterprises experiencing the greatest revenue loss, and the companies who got assistance were more likely to stick to their investment goals. Mid-2021, the European Union's gross saving rate was still 18% of gross disposable income, higher above the average of 11-13%, prior to the COVID-19 pandemic. 63% of large firms, 61% of infrastructure firms and 58% of firms in the service sector are the largest share expecting long term effects of COVID-19.

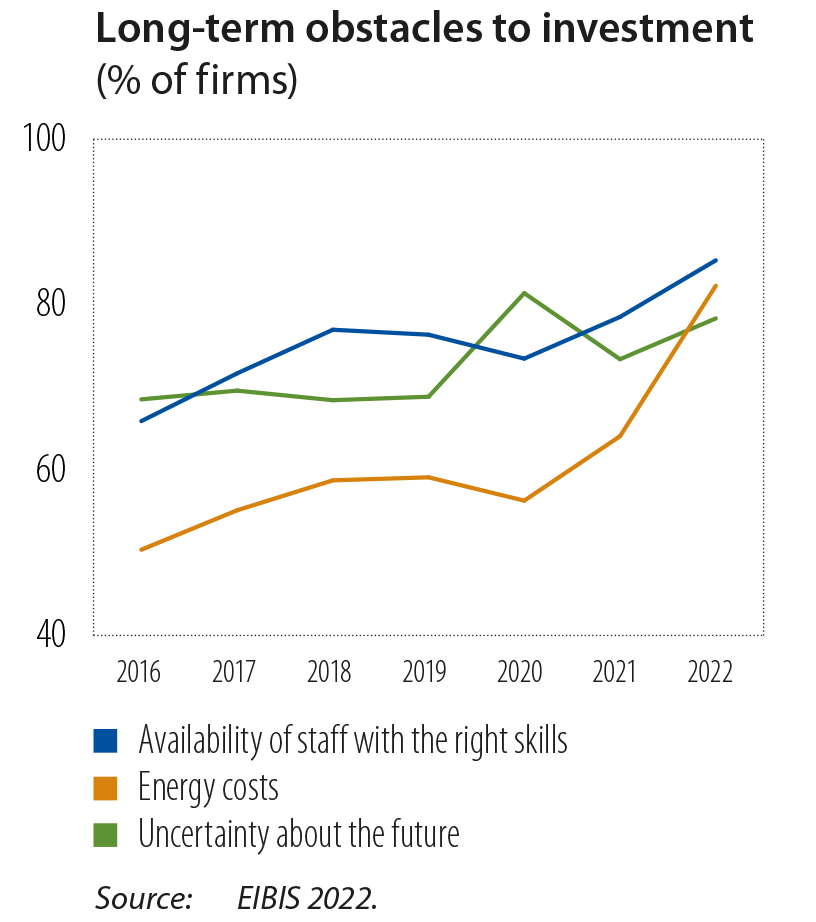
Long-term obstacles to investment for European firms, as found in survey conducted in Europe

Across the European Union, the most commonly mentioned investment barrier is the lack of trained labor. 75% of businesses in transitional regions found this to be problematic. In less developed and non-cohesion regions, it is 79%. Demographics and rising demand for skills that are less common on the market, such as those needed to support digitalization activities, might contribute to the lack of competent workers.

Companies that are located in the countries under the European cohesion policy are less likely to spend money on the types of intangible assets, like R&D or training. Businesses in cohesion regions tend to concentrate their investments more on purchasing real estate, machinery, and other tangible assets. Only 28% of investments are made in intangible activity in areas considered less developed, compared to 35% in transition areas and 39% in more developed areas.

In all regions, bank loans are the most prevalent type of external financing. In less developed regions, they account for 49% of finance, in more developed regions, 58%, and in transitional regions, 69%. Grants make up a larger portion of the financing in less developed areas.

Intangible assets (R&D, software, training, and business processes) were invested in by firms in Central, Eastern and Southeastern Europe countries at a lower rate (24%) in 2022 than the EU average (37%). The proportion of enterprises aiming to prioritize innovation in new goods and services was higher in these regions (27%) than in the EU (24%) and the US (21%). Manufacturing enterprises (36%) and big firms (31%), in particular, have innovation as an investment priority. Among CESEE enterprises, Slovenia (38%) and the Czech Republic (37%), are the most likely to prioritize innovation. Over half of businesses (57%) altered their operations in response to COVID-19. The majority (44%), produced new items (26%), while a minority (16%) reduced their supply chain. 39% of EU enterprises created or introduced new goods, processes, or services in the previous fiscal year, compared to 57% of US firms. In both the EU and the US, little more than 12% of enterprises introduced ideas that were novel to the country or the global market.

Europe's level of productive investment has lagged behind that of the United States - by two percentage points of GDP annually since 2010, according to European Commission data. In comparison to 2021, there is a significant increase in the proportion of enterprises citing energy prices as a limitation to investment (87%), particularly those considering it as a substantial obstacle (63%). The transition to cleaner energy is seen as a danger to investments by 41% of energy-intensive manufacturers in Europe, thus affecting all investment plans. This is compared to 31% of enterprises in non-energy heavy industries. For future investment plans, European energy-intensive manufacturers and firms are more interested in climate investments than non-energy-intensive enterprises, with 48% now investing and 57% planning to invest.

Productive investment, as of 2023 (excluding housing), has been increasing as a percentage of GDP in Europe. There remains a gap of around 1.5 percentage points in productive investment between Europe and the United States, but this growth has helped Europe keep up with the rate of productive investment growth in the United States to a certain extent. Although Europe is not falling further behind like during the sovereign debt crisis, European firms state narrowing this gap as a priority.

Infrastructure enterprises were somewhat more likely than other firms to invest insufficiently in 2022 according to survey data. The same was true for SMEs (21%) against large businesses (15%). Firms in Lithuania (28%) and Latvia (30%) are the most likely to believe they have invested insufficiently during the previous three years. The proportion of enterprises that believe they have overinvested was largest (but still minor) in Hungary (7%), Bulgaria (7%), and the Czech Republic (6%).

Most companies in Central, Eastern and Southeastern Europe (59%), and the rest of the EU (57%) projected their revenues to be greater in 2022 than they were in 2019. COVID-19 has had a negative impact on 45% of the enterprises in those regions. Almost one-third of those surveyed (13% of total enterprises) did not anticipate a recovery, whereas the vast majority did. Even throughout the pandemic, 41% of enterprises observed an increase in revenue, and the majority of them predicted stronger sales in 2022.

Long-term hurdles to corporate investment continue to be energy prices, uncertainty, and a shortage of skills, with 83%, 78%, and 81% of enterprises citing these concerns as restraints, respectively. EU enterprises were more likely than US firms to cite energy prices as a key impediment. In 2022 - 2023, EU businesses were found increasingly unhappy with the cost of credit as monetary policy tightened and external finance conditions deteriorated. This dissatisfaction is at more than 14% in 2023, compared to 5% in 2022.

In 2023, Austrian enterprises are the most likely to grow stock and inventory, while Romanian firms are the most likely to invest in digital inventory and input tracking. Romania has the largest proportion of importers lowering the proportion of goods/services imported from abroad, as well as the highest proportion of enterprises diversifying or growing the number of countries from which they import. Also in the same year, 80% of EU firms were profitable, which was 2 percentage points higher than the historical average. Firms that achieved profits of at least 10% of their turnover were 8% more likely to increase their investment compared to firms that only broke even. Policy support and financial reserves have played a crucial role in protecting and maintaining corporate investment. Despite the energy crisis that started in 2022, firms were able to meet their investment expectations, thanks to the support and buffers in place.

Credit demand in the Central, Eastern and Southern European regions remained strong in the first six months of 2023, although it has been steadily declining since 2021-22. Fixed investments and retail components, particularly the housing sector, contributed adversely, while credit demand was once again driven by corporate liquidity requirements (particularly for inventories and working capital). In the previous six months, most parent banks in Central, Eastern, and South-Eastern Europe nations have maintained their level of exposure. Major players in Serbia and Romania engaged in some mergers and acquisitions activities. Banks foresee an increase in non-performing loans (NPLs), which would hit the retail and business sectors in virtually all countries (excluding Albania).

According to data from a European survey, big mid-caps account for the greatest percentage of high-growth and very high-growth enterprises, at 7.5% and 3.1%, respectively, followed by SMEs at 6% and 2%. XLs and tiny mid-caps trail somewhat, accounting for 5.2-5.5% and 1.9-2.1% of high- and very-high-growth enterprises, respectively. Manufacturing businesses with big mid-caps and XL firms have the greatest percentage of extremely high-growth firms.

Europe in particular suffers from a lack of funding for more mature scale-up operations. Financing for these operations is six to eight times higher in the United States (in dollars). Corporate investment among EU countries varies significantly due to distinct national factors. The sectoral breakdown of aggregate investment is not yet accessible for all EU members, even for early 2023. In some European nations, real corporate investment increased by 5% or more by early 2023, while in others it remained stagnant or far lower than pre-pandemic levels. In 2023, enterprises with profits of at least 10% of turnover were 8 percentage points more likely to increase investment than enterprises that broke even. A main point in 2023 has been that EU enterprises embraced modern digital technology and were able to close an 11 point deficit with the United States in their usage of those technology.

According to recent intelligence reported by GlobalData, the global Uncrewed Aerial Systems (UAS) market is projected to see a significant increase over the coming decade. An estimated compound annual growth rate of 4.8% is expected, primarily owing to the swift rise in Europe's UAS market. This growth is poised to almost double the UAS market size, from $12.5 billion in 2024 to an impressive $20 billion by 2034. This growth is largely attributed to Europe's rising prominence in the UAS market sector.

In the EU, less firms were expecting to increase investment in 2024, falling to a net balance of 7%. European businesses invest 37% of their capital in intangible assets, prioritizing them over physical assets like land, buildings, and infrastructure. Only 14% of European firms focus on these physical assets, while in the US, 24% of companies focus on the same assets. 26% of EU firms also invest in expansion.

Market potential in Central, Eastern, and South-Eastern Europe is predominantly assessed as high, particularly in Czechia and Romania, or medium, especially in Western Balkan markets. According to surveyed banks, profitability in the region exceeds that of overall group operations, notably in Hungary and Kosovo. Banks in the Western Balkans report even stronger profitability, with Albania being a notable exception.

Approximately 20% of parent banks in Central, Eastern, and South-Eastern Europe anticipate asset sales or strategic restructuring at the group level. Banking groups in the region are focusing on deleveraging by either increasing or maintaining stable loan-to-deposit ratios.

International banking groups in Central, Eastern, and South-Eastern Europe mostly maintained their regional exposure over the six months leading to October 2024. According to surveyed banks in a study conducted by the European Investment Bank, 45% aim to selectively expand operations, down from 58% earlier in the year, while 55% plan to maintain current levels. These trends reflect cautious long-term strategies amid changing economic conditions.

=== Transport ===
E-Road Network over 1990 borders

Transport in Europe provides for the movement needs of over 700 million people and associated freight. The political geography of Europe divides the continent into over 50 sovereign states and territories. This fragmentation, along with increased movement of people since the Industrial Revolution, has led to a high level of cooperation between European countries in developing and maintaining transport networks. Supranational and intergovernmental organisations such as the European Union (EU), Council of Europe and the Organization for Security and Co-operation in Europe have led to the development of international standards and agreements that allow people and freight to cross the borders of Europe, largely with unique levels of freedom and ease.

==== Rail transport ====
Operational high-speed railway lines

Rail networks in Western and Central Europe are often well maintained and well developed, whilst Eastern, Northern and Southern Europe often have less coverage and/or infrastructure problems. Electrified railway networks operate at a plethora of different voltages AC and DC varying from 750 to 25,000 volts, and signalling systems vary from country to country, hindering cross-border traffic. EU rail subsidies amounted to €73 billion in 2005.

==== Air transport ====
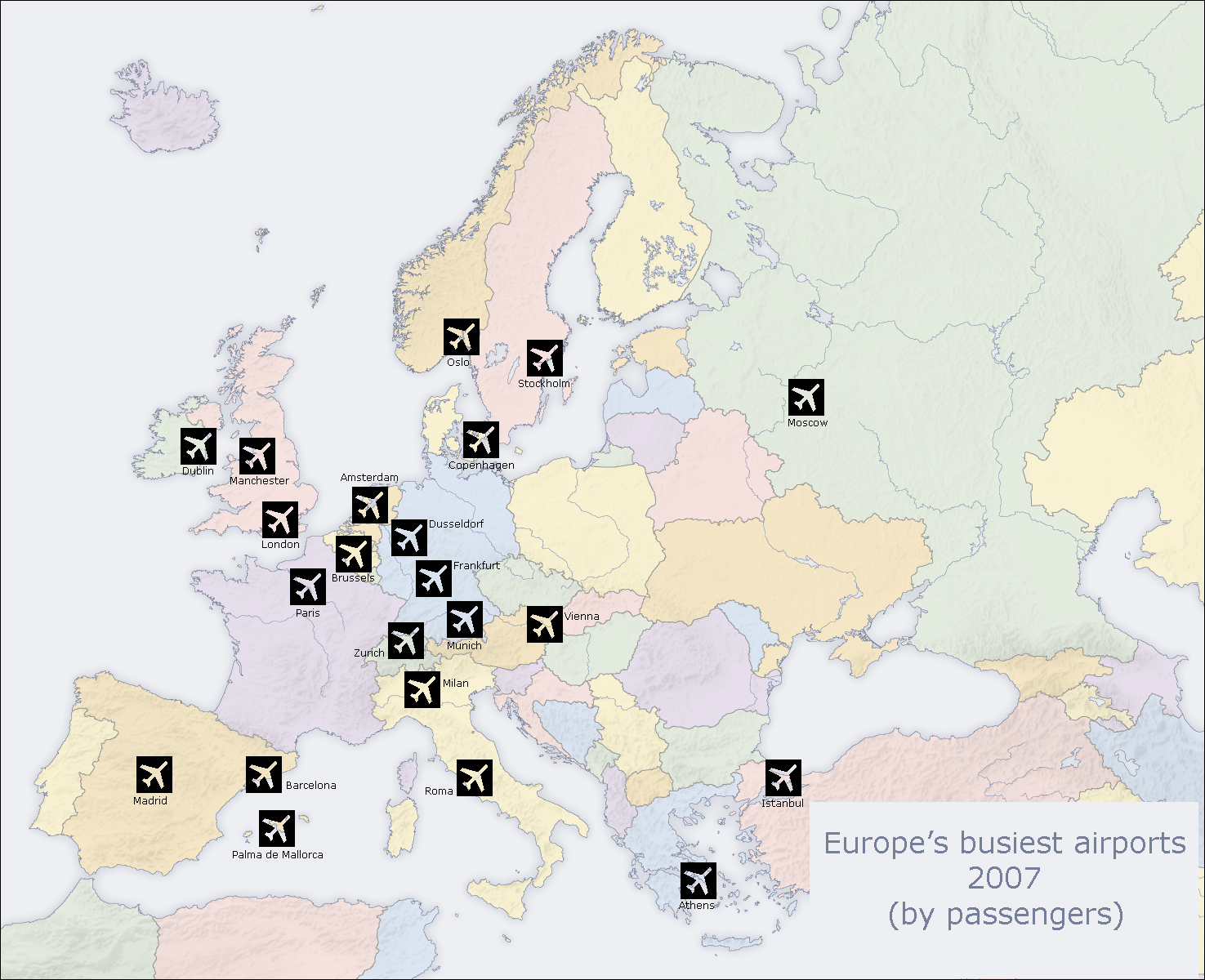
Busiest airports as of 2007

Despite an extensive road and rail network, most long-distance travel within Europe is by air. A large tourism industry also attracts many visitors to Europe, most of whom arrive into one of Europe's many large international airports. London is the second busiest airport in the world by number of international passengers, only trailing Dubai. The advent of low cost carriers in recent years has led to a large increase in air travel within Europe. Air transportation is now often the cheapest way of travelling between cities. This increase in air travel has led to problems of airspace overcrowding and environmental concerns. The Single European Sky is one initiative aimed at solving these problems.

=== Tech industry ===
Historically, Europe lagged in producing high-net-worth tech founders, and it remains unlikely to displace the United States as the global tech hegemon. Nevertheless, in the 2020s, the European technology sector has undergone a transformation, and Europe has become increasingly competitive in climate tech, defense tech, and deep tech. As of 2026, Europe accounts for six of the world's 100 most valuable technology companies.

Between 2015 and 2025, European venture capital investment rose from $22 billion to $85 billion, and the region's share of global VC grew from 12% to 16%. In contrast, American VC investment reached $339 billion in 2025. Within Europe, there has been a significant pivot toward capital-intensive sectors; deep tech's share of total European VC grew from 19% in 2021 to 36% in 2025.

The European Commission is currently pursuing the unification of capital markets to streamline funding for startups. The United Kingdom, France, and Germany have adjusted pension regulations to permit greater investment in high-risk technology ventures. Additionally, the EU is exploring protectionist measures, such as encouraging member states to prioritize domestic tech startups in government procurement. According to The Economist, the emergence of multi-billion-dollar valuations in Europe suggests that the prospect of a trillion-dollar European tech firm is no longer improbable.

== Trade relations ==
Europe is one of the world’s largest trading entities, with Germany, France and the United Kingdom serving as the primary economic powerhouses in terms of both exports and imports. Germany is Europe's largest exporter and importer and the third-largest exporter globally, with over $2 trillion in exports in 2022. Germany is also a major importer, with $1.5 trillion in imports in 2022, reflecting its role as a key player in global supply chains. France is the second-largest exporter in Europe, with over $1 trillion in exports in 2022. France is also a significant importer, with $850 billion in imports in 2022, the second largest importer in Europe. The United Kingdom is the third-largest exporter in Europe, with over $1 trillion in exports in 2022. The United Kingdom is also a significant importer, with $800 billion in imports in 2022, the third largest importer in Europe.

The bulk of the EU's external trade is done with China, Mercosur and the United States, Japan, Russia and non-member European states. EU members are represented by a single official at the WTO. The EU is involved in a few minor trade disputes. It had a long running dispute with the USA of allegedly unfair subsidies the US government gives to several companies, such as Boeing. The EU has a long running ban prohibiting arms trade with the Chinese. The EU issued a brief accusing Microsoft of predatory and monopolistic practices.

On 27 July 2025, the United States and the European Union concluded a trade agreement, imposing a 15% tariff on European exports to the United States. European states committed to $750 billion in energy purchases and $600 billion in additional investments in the United States.

== See also ==
- Free trade areas in Europe
- Golden Banana
- Culture of Europe
- List of companies of the European Union
- List of largest European companies by revenue
- Regions of Europe
