= List of European stock exchanges =

In the European region, there are multiple stock exchanges among which five are considered major (as having a market cap of over US$1 trillion):

- Euronext, which is a pan-European, Dutch-domiciled and France-headquartered stock exchange composed of eight market places in Belgium, France, Greece, Ireland, the Netherlands, Italy, Norway, and Portugal.
- London Stock Exchange Group, which is a global stock exchange composed of the London Stock Exchange.
- Deutsche Börse, which operates Europe's third largest stock exchange, the Frankfurt Stock Exchange/Xetra.
- SIX Group, which operates Switzerland's major stock exchange, SIX Swiss Exchange, and Spain's major stock exchanges, Bolsas y Mercados Españoles, as well as Aquis Stock Exchange.
- Nasdaq Nordic, which is composed of Nordic stock exchanges; including Sweden, Denmark, Finland and Iceland, with activity in Norway and the Faroe Islands.

== List ==
Country	Group	Stock exchange	City	Founded	Listings	Technology	Operating MIC
Pan-European	SIX Group	Aquis Stock Exchange	London	2012	87	Aquis Technologies	AQSE
Pan-European	Cboe	Cboe Europe	London	2007		Cboe Titanium	CCXE
Pan-European	Euronext	Euronext Amsterdam	Amsterdam	1602	3761	OPTIQ	XAMS
Pan-European	Euronext	Euronext Athens	Athens	1876	3761	OPTIQ	XATH
Pan-European	Euronext	Euronext Brussels	Brussels	1801	3761	OPTIQ	XBRU
Pan-European	Euronext	Euronext Dublin	Dublin	1793	3761	OPTIQ	XDUB
Pan-European	Euronext	Euronext Lisbon	Lisbon	1769	3761	OPTIQ	XLIS
Pan-European	Euronext	Borsa Italiana	Milan	1808	3761	OPTIQ	XMIL
Pan-European	Euronext	Oslo Stock Exchange	Oslo	1819	3761	OPTIQ	XOSL
Pan-European	Euronext	Euronext Paris	Paris	1724	3761	OPTIQ	XPAR
Pan-European	Nasdaq Baltic	Nasdaq Vilnius	Vilnius	1992	Main: 51; MTF: 19	INET Nordic	XLIT
Pan-European	Nasdaq Baltic	Nasdaq Riga	Riga	1993	Main: 51; MTF: 19	INET Nordic	XRIS
Pan-European	Nasdaq Baltic	Nasdaq Tallinn	Tallinn	1995	Main: 51; MTF: 19	INET Nordic	XTAL
Pan-European	Nasdaq Nordic	Nasdaq Copenhagen	Copenhagen	1808	Main: 698; FNGM: 476	INET Nordic	XCSE
Pan-European	Nasdaq Nordic	Nasdaq Stockholm	Stockholm	1863	Main: 698; FNGM: 476	INET Nordic	XSTO
Pan-European	Nasdaq Nordic	Nasdaq Helsinki	Helsinki	1912	Main: 698; FNGM: 476	INET Nordic	XHEL
Pan-European	Nasdaq Nordic	Nasdaq Iceland	Reykjavík	1985	Main: 698; FNGM: 476	INET Nordic	XICE
Albania		Tirana Stock Exchange	Tirana	1996	4		XTIR
Armenia	Warsaw Stock Exchange	Armenia Stock Exchange	Yerevan	2001			XAMX
Austria		Wiener Börse	Vienna	1771	63	T7	XWBO
Azerbaijan		Baku Stock Exchange	Baku	2000	27		BSEX
Belarus		Belarusian Currency and Stock Exchange	Minsk	1998			BCSE
Bosnia and Herzegovina		Sarajevo Stock Exchange	Sarajevo	2001			XSSE
Bosnia and Herzegovina		Banja Luka Stock Exchange	Banja Luka	2001			XBLB
Bulgaria		Bulgarian Stock Exchange	Sofia	1914		T7	XBUL
Guernsey		The International Stock Exchange	Guernsey	2013	4000		TISE
Croatia		Zagreb Stock Exchange	Zagreb	1907	118	T7	XZAG
Cyprus		Cyprus Stock Exchange	Nicosia	1996			XCYS
Czech Republic	Wiener Börse	Prague Stock Exchange	Prague	1871	29	T7	XPRA
Faroe Islands		Faroese Securities Market	Tórshavn	2004			VMFX
Georgia		Georgian Stock Exchange	Tbilisi	1999	261		XGSE
Germany		Berliner Börse	Berlin	1685	29461	Xontro, Equiduct	XBER
Germany		Börse Düsseldorf	Düsseldorf	1853		Xontro	XDUS
Germany		Hamburg Stock Exchange	Hamburg/Hanover	1558		Xontro	XHAM/XHAN
Germany		Börse München	Munich	1830		MAX-ONE	XMUN
Germany		Börse Stuttgart	Stuttgart	1861		Xitaro	XSTU
Germany	Deutsche Börse	Deutsche Börse Frankfurt	Frankfurt	1585	1555843	T7	XFRA
Germany	Deutsche Börse	Deutsche Börse Xetra	Frankfurt	1997	3580	T7	XETR
Germany		Tradegate Exchange	Berlin	2009	9100		XGAT, XGRM
Gibraltar		Gibraltar Stock Exchange	Gibraltar	2014			GSXL
Hungary		Budapest Stock Exchange	Budapest	1864	61	T7	XBUD
Kazakhstan		Kazakhstan Stock Exchange	Almaty	1993			XKAZ
Kazakhstan		Astana International Exchange	Astana	2017			AIXK
Luxembourg		Luxembourg Stock Exchange	Luxembourg	1927	49,994	OPTIQ	XLUX
Malta		Malta Stock Exchange	Valletta	1992	320	T7	XMAL
Moldova		Moldova Stock Exchange	Chișinău	1994			XMOL
Montenegro		Montenegro Stock Exchange	Podgorica	1993			XMNX
Netherlands		Nxchange	Amsterdam	2015	8		XNXC
Netherlands		NPEX	The Hague	2009			NPEX
North Macedonia		Macedonian Stock Exchange	Skopje	1995			XMAE
Poland	Warsaw Stock Exchange	Warsaw Stock Exchange	Warsaw	1817	449	UTP	XWAR
Romania		Bucharest Stock Exchange	Bucharest	1882	83		XBSE
Russia		Moscow Exchange	Moscow	2013 (1992)			MISX
Russia		Saint Petersburg Stock Exchange	Saint Petersburg	1997			SPIM
Serbia		Belgrade Stock Exchange	Belgrade	1894	66		XBEL
Slovakia		Bratislava Stock Exchange	Bratislava	1991			XBRA
Slovenia	Zagreb Stock Exchange	Ljubljana Stock Exchange	Ljubljana	1989	58	T7	XLJU
Spain	SIX Group	Bolsa de Barcelona	Barcelona	1915			BMEX
Spain	SIX Group	Bolsa de Bilbao	Bilbao	1890			BMEX
Spain	SIX Group	Bolsa de Madrid	Madrid	1831			BMEX
Spain	SIX Group	Mercado Oficial Español de Futuros y Opciones	Madrid	1989			BMEX
Spain	SIX Group	Bolsa de Valencia	Valencia	1981			BMEX
Sweden	Börse Stuttgart	Nordic Growth Market	Stockholm	2003	Main: 6 SME: 104	Elasticia	XNGM
Sweden	Spotlight Group	Spotlight Stock Market	Stockholm	1997	138	INET Nordic	XSAT
Switzerland	SIX Group	SIX Swiss Exchange	Zurich	1850	266		XSWX
Switzerland	Börse Stuttgart	BX Swiss	Zurich	1888	18	Elasticia	XBRN
Turkey		Borsa Istanbul	Istanbul	1866	417		XIST
Ukraine		PFTS Ukraine Stock Exchange	Kyiv	2002			PFTS
Ukraine		Ukrainian Exchange	Kyiv	2008	88		XUAX
United Kingdom	LSEG	London Stock Exchange	London	1571	2800	Millennium	XLON

== See also ==
- Central banks and currencies of Europe
- List of stock exchanges
- European Central Bank
- Federation of Euro-Asian Stock Exchanges
