= Eka Ghazadze =

Eka Ghazadze ეკა ღაზაძე

Deputy Auditor General of Georgia
- Incumbent
- Assumed office October 2017

Personal details
- Born: 13 February 1979 (age 47) Tbilisi
- Education: Technical University of Georgia

Eka Ghazadze (Georgian: ეკა ღაზაძე; born February 13, 1979) is a Georgian financier, who has served as Deputy Auditor General of Georgia since October 2017.

== Working Experience ==
Georgian Stock Exchange (GSE) Chief Financial Officer and Chief Operating Officer (2017); DCFTA External Communication Strategy — Investment Expert (2016); Tbilisi Silk Road Forum — Project Coordinator, Consultant, Asian Development Bank (2015); JSC Bank of Georgia (later JSC Galt &Taggart), Georgia) — Head of Research Department (2015-2012); Renaissance Capital — Kazakhstan and UK — Equity Research Analyst (2012-2007); European Bank for Reconstruction and Development — Associate Banker, UK Head Office (2006-2007), 9-month rotation, Financial Analyst — (2002-2006); International Monetary Fund — Assistant to IMF Advisor to the Ministry of Finance of Georgia (2001-2002); State Department for Statistics of Georgia — Acting Head, Balance of Payments Division (2000-2001).

== Education ==
MSc in Investment Management (Scholarship from British Petroleum/British Council) Cass Business School, City University of London (2006-2007) Master of International Economic Relations; Technical University of Georgia (2001-2003).

Besides native Georgian, speaks English and Russian languages.
