= Novogenia GmbH =

Austrian biotech company

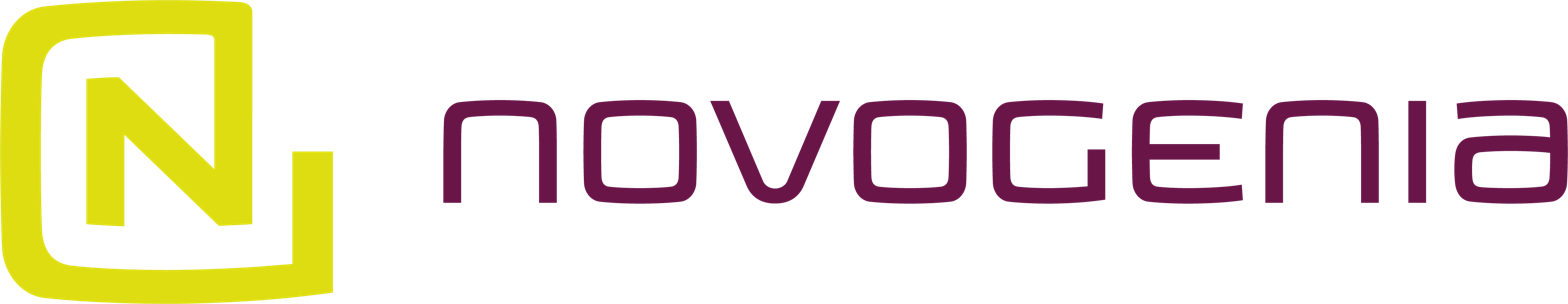

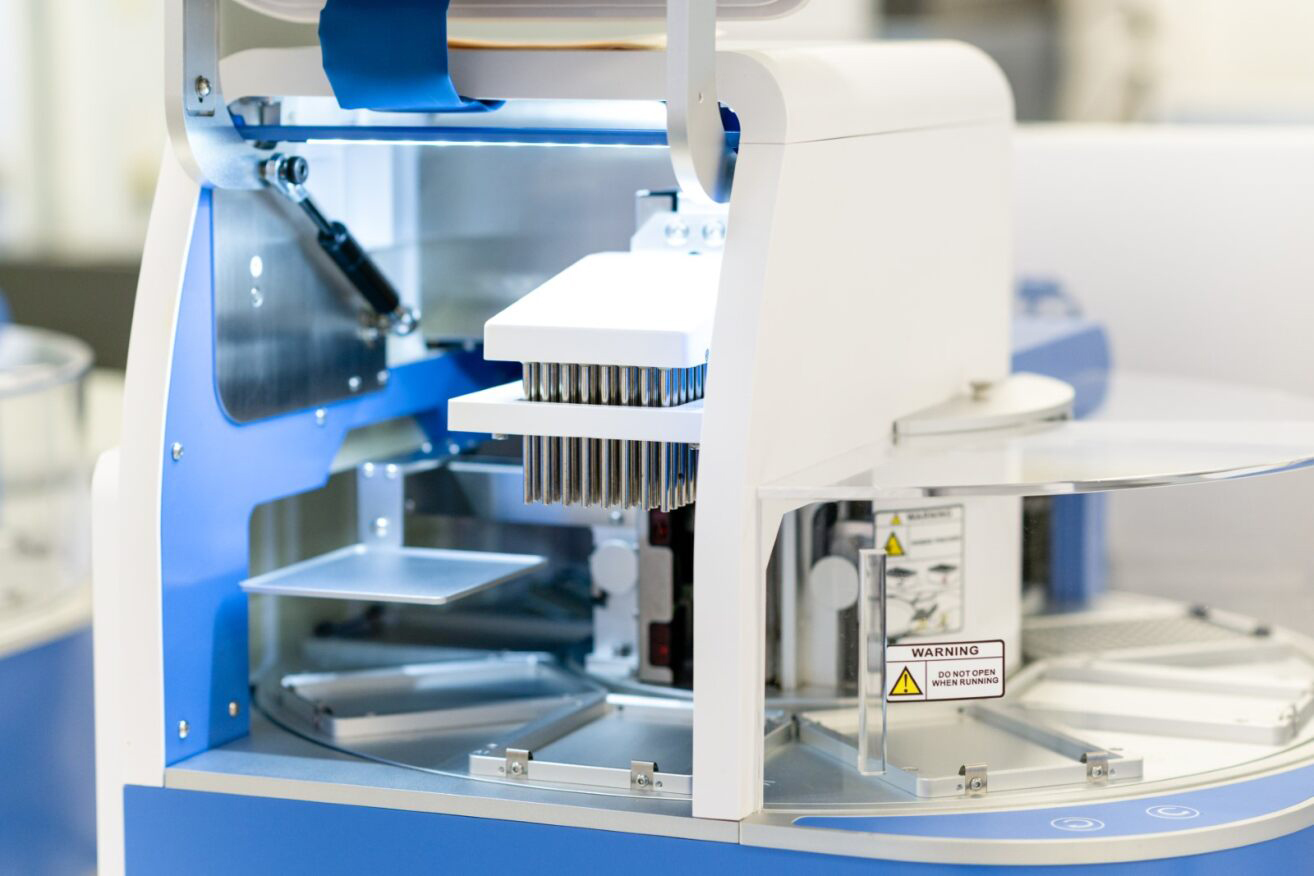
- Industry: Biotechnology
- Founded: 2009; 16 years ago
- Founder: Daniel Wallerstorfer
- Headquarters: Salzburg, Austria
- Key people: Dr. Daniel Wallerstorfer (Founder & Chief Executive Officer), Michael Huttegger (Chief Operating Officer), Matthias Probst (Chief Financial Officer)
- Number of employees: 120 (2024)
- Website: novogenia.com

Novogenia GmbH is a biotechnology firm that provides medical and lifestyle genetic tests, blood analysis services, personalized nutrition supplements, and cosmetics. In 2021, Novogenia went public on the Munich stock exchange under its parent company Darwin AG.

== History ==
Novogenia GmbH was founded in 2009 in Salzburg, Austria. The company shortly got a license from the Austrian government to conduct medical genetic testing and swiftly ventured into preventive genetic testing.

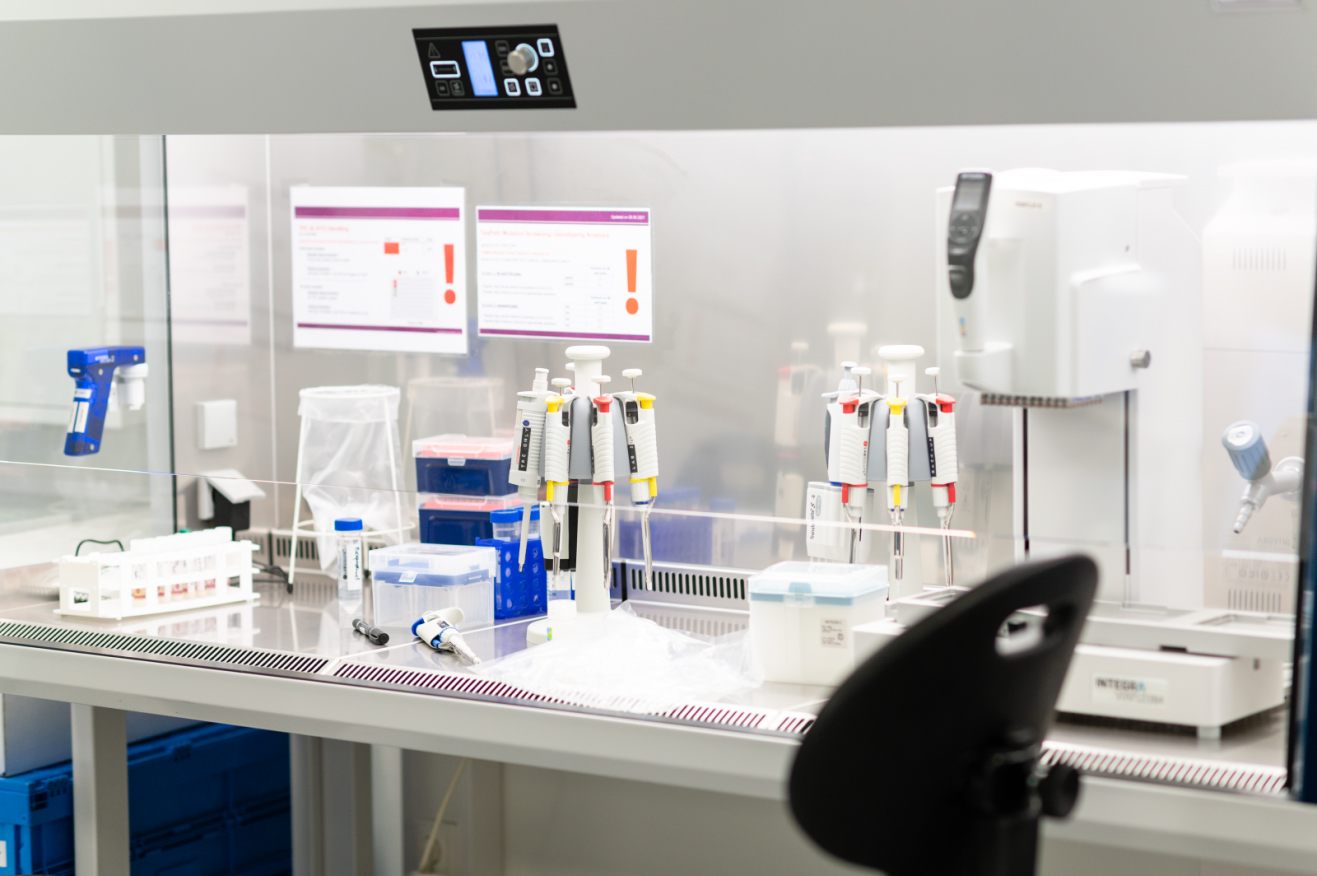
Novogenia's lab

In 2012, Novogenia GmbH acquired Genosense Diagnostics, an Austrian competitor based in Vienna. In 2018, the company introduced Deep Genome AI, which uses artificial intelligence to interpret and store genetic research data, accelerating the development of gene-based products. In 2019, firm's operations expanded due to the COVID-19 crisis, emerging as Austria's largest COVID-19 laboratory, conducting up to 275,000 tests daily and producing millions of medical devices for sample collection.

On October 18, 2021, Novogenia founder Daniel Wallerstorfer was awarded "Entrepreneur of the Year" in the category of "Innovation & Hightech Rising Stars" in Salzburg. In 2022, the Austrian business magazine *Trend* listed Wallerstorfer with an estimated net worth of €300 million, ranking him 86th among the 100 richest Austrians, primarily due to his shareholdings in Novogenia.

In December 2021, Novogenia GmbH underwent an Initial Public Offering (IPO) on the Munich stock exchange under DARWIN AG, a biotechnology group of companies.

== Activities ==
Novogenia's laboratory conducts genetic and blood analyses, producing personalized reports from these assessments. The laboratory handles a peak load of 275,000 samples daily and has conducted over 35 million PCR analyses.

Also, the laboratory offers gene and allergy analyses, employing advanced analytical techniques like microfluidics and DNA microarrays. It captures up to 30 million genetic variations per sample and provides insights into nutrigenetics, performance enhancement, and skin genetics.

Novogenia specializes in creating personalized food supplements through advanced blood and genetic analysis, tailoring blends of micronutrients to each customer's needs for optimized health support. It's approach offers over 700 trillion possible formulations based on genetic analyses, employing a specialized algorithm to ensure personalized nutrient recipes within safety limits.

Additionally, Novogenia engages in personalized cosmetic production, using genetic analysis to customize skincare products.

Moreover, Novogenia has funded and developed the open-access genetics platform Genopedia , a freely accessible human‐genetics database that enables users, researchers and clinicians to explore human genes, conditions, variants and traits within a searchable interface.
