= NEX Stock Exchange =

Defunct Montenegrin stock exchange

The New Securities Stock Exchange or NEX Stock Exchange (NEX) was a stock exchange located in Podgorica, Montenegro. The NEX Stock Exchange was founded 2001. It was one of two principal stock exchanges in Montenegro, the other being the Montenegro Stock Exchange, also in Podgorica. In January 2010, stockholders in NEX approved a merger with the Montenegro Stock Exchange, initially expected to take place within two to three months. However, the two were technically merged as of 31 December 2010, with their systems jointly operating since 10 January 2011. Thus, NEX Stock Exchange ceased to exist as a legal subject. The merger consolidated and simplified securities trading in Montenegro.

== See also ==
- Economy of Montenegro
- List of stock exchanges
- List of European stock exchanges
