= Jordan Securities Commission =

- هيئة الأوراق المالية

Agency overview
- Formed: 2002
- Jurisdiction: Jordanian government
- Headquarters: Amman (Jordan)
- Agency executive: H.E. MR. Emad Abu Haltam, Chairman
- Website: www.jsc.gov.jo

The Jordan Securities Commission (JSC) (Arabic: هيئة الاوراق المالية) is the regulatory authority responsible for supervising and regulating capital markets in Jordan.

== History ==
The Jordan Securities Commission (JSC) was established in 1997 as a public institution with financial and administrative autonomy to develop, regulate and monitor Jordan’s capital market to maintain a sound investment environment and protect investors. The JSC is entrusted with developing the capital market in accordance with international standards to secure fairness, safety and attract domestic and foreign investors.

In order to ensure fairness, sovereignty and proper administration of the rule of law, the JSC continuously enforces the Securities Law and its related regulations. It regulates, monitors, and supervises the business operations of the Amman Stock Exchange, the Securities Depository Center, financial services companies, public shareholding companies, investment funds and certified financial professionals. Furthermore, the JSC is committed to securing investor protection and market development and to enforcing disclosure of information regulations pertaining to the securities market.

== Purpose and responsibilities ==
=== Purpose ===
The Jordan Securities Commission is responsible for regulating and supervising Jordan's capital market. Its functions include monitoring securities disclosure, licensing and supervising financial services activities, regulating securities dealing, protecting investors and supporting compliance with securities legislation.

== Responsibilities ==
- Issue legislations that regulate and develop the capital market and assist in providing a proper environment for investing in securities.
- Provide the investor with all necessary information needed to support his investment decision including transparency and disclosure whether for issuing companies performance or for the trading process or for parties subject to the Commission’s monitoring and supervision.
- Develop the necessary financial services for the capital market.
- Promote the establishment of mutual funds and regulate these funds to provide investment opportunities for small investors and efficient investment management.
- Implement up to date international standards in the capital market and related entities for disclosure, electronic trading, electronic keeping and price settlement of securities, as well as up-to-date International Accounting and Auditing Standards on parties subject to the JSC monitoring and supervision.
- Accredit the Standards of Professional Conduct for people working at the JSC, ASE, SDC and their members.
- Impose penalties on violators of the Law and those who commit prohibited acts.
- Disseminate awareness among investors and the public in general in issues relevant to the national capital market and its entities, as well as other issues related to investing in securities.
- Provide continuous training for JSC staff and for people working at the ASE and SDC to enhance their academic and professional levels, in addition to people working in licensed services companies and registered persons.
- Receive and investigate complaints from the public and investors, to undertake proper procedures by imposing penalties on violators of the provisions of Law, instructions, and regulations issued pursuant to it.
- Enhance the monitoring software on parties subject to the JSC surveillance and enhance daily supervision on trading at the ASE

== Monitoring and supervision ==
- Amman Stock Exchange (ASE)
- Securities Depository Centre (SDC)
- Public Shareholding Companies.
- Licensed Financial Services Companies.
- Mutual Funds and Investment Companies

== International relations ==
- JSC was notified in February 2008 by International Organization of Securities Commissions (IOSCO) that it has fulfilled all conditions & standards to qualify to be a signatory to the IOSCO Multilateral Memorandum of Understanding (MMOU). This qualification is an indicator adopted by international institutions especially, the World Bank (WB) & the International Monetary Fund (IMF) of the extent of compliance with international standards as part of the Financial Sector Assessment Program (FSAP).
- JSC chosen first for presidency of the Council of Arab Supervisory Commissions Union on Securities Markets established on 31 January 2007

== See also ==
- List of financial supervisory authorities by country
