= Securities Depository Center (Jordan) =

Securities Depository Center (SDC)

Agency overview
- Formed: 1999
- Jurisdiction: Jordanian government
- Headquarters: Amman (Jordan)
- Agency executives: Dr. Adeeb Haddad, Chairman; Mrs. Sarah Tarawneh, CEO
- Website: www.sdc.com.jo

The Securities Depository Center (SDC) (Arabic: مركز إيداع الأوراق المالية) is the central securities depository of Jordan. It is a public utility institution established in the Kingdom by the Securities Law of 1997.

== History ==
The Securities Depository Center was established in 1997. The Securities Law of 1997 separated the functions of the Amman Financial Market (AFM) and created the Jordan Securities Commission (JSC), the Amman Stock Exchange (ASE) and the Securities Depository Center (SDC). The SDC subjects to the JSC's monitoring and supervision

== Goals and objectives ==
- Enhance the confidence of investors in securities and enable them to follow up their investments with ease by establishing a central registry to safe-keep the ownership of securities.
- Reduce risks related to settlement of trading transactions executed through the market by implementing by-laws, instructions and procedures that are fair, fast and safe.

== Functions and services ==
The SDC, which has a legal personality with financial and administrative autonomy is the only entity in Jordan that is legally empowered by the Securities Law of 2022 to oversee the following responsibilities:-

- Registration, safekeeping, and depositing of securities
- Transferring the ownership of securities
- Clearing and Settlement of Securities
- Imposing and releasing the ownership restrictions upon deposited securities

In order for the SDC to perform its operations, it was necessary to establish a central registry and depository of authenticated shareholders along with a central settlement process. This ensures that the shareholders registers of all public shareholding companies are held and maintained at the SDC in electronic form. The SDC is one of the major institutions in the Jordan Capital Market as it holds the ownership registers of all issued shares. It has been assigned, in cooperation with the JSC and the ASE, the task of developing the Jordan Capital Market.

In addition to the SDC's responsibilities that are assigned by virtue of the Securities Law, the SDC performs the following tasks in order to fulfill its goals:

- Supervision and monitoring the SDC's members' activities related to the SDC.
- Set and apply rules related to the SDC's facilities and how to benefit from its services.
- Express opinion on legislations and its amendments that related to the SDC's works and propose legislations and procedures to guarantee protection the investors, the owner of the securities.
- Issuing reports and publish information and statistics about the SDC's activities
- Establish cooperative relations with other securities depository centers and Arab, regional and international organizations in the securities field and conclude agreements to serve the objectives of the SDC.
- Establish and manage Settlement Guarantee Fund.

== Recognition ==
- The SDC has been recognized by the Association of National Numbering Agencies (ANNA) and the JSC as the sole numbering agency in Jordan for the assignment of International Securities Identification Number (ISIN). All share books at the SDC are numbered according to the ISIN numbering scheme.
- The SDC is a member of the Federation of Euro-Asian Stock Exchanges
- The SDC is a member of the Africa and Middle East Depositories Association
