= Central banks and currencies of Europe =

This is a list of central banks and currencies of Europe.

== Euro area ==
The currency of the euro area is the euro, and its central bank is the European Central Bank. Each country of the area has a National Central Bank that participates in the Eurosystem.

Country	Currency	National Central Bank	Pegged with
Austria	Euro	Oesterreichische Nationalbank	float
Belgium	Euro	National Bank of Belgium	float
Bulgaria	Euro	Bulgarian National Bank	float
Croatia	Euro	Croatian National Bank	float
Cyprus	Euro	Central Bank of Cyprus	float
Estonia	Euro	Bank of Estonia	float
Finland	Euro	Bank of Finland	float
France	Euro	Bank of France	float
Germany	Euro	Deutsche Bundesbank	float
Greece	Euro	Bank of Greece	float
Ireland	Euro	Central Bank of Ireland	float
Italy	Euro	Bank of Italy	float
Latvia	Euro	Bank of Latvia	float
Lithuania	Euro	Bank of Lithuania	float
Luxembourg	Euro	Central Bank of Luxembourg	float
Malta	Euro	Central Bank of Malta	float
Netherlands	Euro	De Nederlandsche Bank	float
Portugal	Euro	Banco de Portugal	float
Slovakia	Euro	National Bank of Slovakia	float
Slovenia	Euro	Bank of Slovenia	float
Spain	Euro	Bank of Spain	float

Four European microstates participate in the euro area through monetary agreements with the EU, granting them the rights to produce limited quantities of euro coins with their own design on the national side, but not to issue euro banknotes. These countries' financial authorities, whether named central banks or not, are primarily supervisory authorities.

- Andorra: Andorran Financial Authority
- Monaco: Commission de Contrôle des Activités Financières
- San Marino: Central Bank of San Marino
- Vatican City: Institute for the Works of Religion

Two additional countries have adopted the euro unilaterally, and are not technically part of the euro area even though they use the euro as their currency.

- Kosovo: Central Bank of Kosovo
- Montenegro: Central Bank of Montenegro

== Non-Eurozone currencies ==
Country	Currency	Central bank	Pegged with
Albania	Albanian lek	Bank of Albania	
Armenia	Armenian Dram	Central Bank of Armenia	
Azerbaijan	Azerbaijani Manat	Central Bank of Azerbaijan	
Belarus	Belarusian rubel	National Bank of the Republic of Belarus	
Bosnia and Herzegovina	Bosnia and Herzegovina convertible mark	Central Bank of Bosnia and Herzegovina	1 EUR = 1.95583 BAM
Czech Republic	Czech koruna	Czech National Bank	
Denmark	Danish krone	Danmarks Nationalbank	1 EUR = 7.46038 DDK (ERM II)
Georgia	Georgian Lari	National Bank of Georgia	
Hungary	Hungarian forint	Hungarian National Bank	
Kazakhstan	Kazakh tenge	National Bank of Kazakhstan	
Poland	Polish złoty	National Bank of Poland	
Russia	Russian rouble	Bank of Russia	
Romania	Romanian leu	National Bank of Romania	
Serbia	Serbian dinar	National Bank of Serbia	
Liechtenstein	Swiss franc	Liechtensteinische Landesbank	float
Switzerland	Swiss franc	Swiss National Bank	float
Sweden	Swedish krona	Sveriges Riksbank	float
North Macedonia	Macedonian denar	National Bank of North Macedonia	1 EUR = 61,5 MKD
Norway	Norwegian krone	Norges Bank	float
Moldova	Moldovan leu	National Bank of Moldova	
United Kingdom (Note: In addition to the UK itself, the British Crown Dependencies of Guernsey, Isle of Man, Jersey and a British Overseas Territory of Gibraltar are the other pound sterling users in Europe. All four issue local versions of the pound sterling which are pegged with GBP. The British military bases in Cyprus (Akrotiri and Dhekelia) use the euro.)	Sterling	Bank of England	float
Ukraine	Ukrainian hryvnia	National Bank of Ukraine	float
Iceland	Icelandic króna	Central Bank of Iceland	float
Turkey	Turkish lira	Central Bank of the Republic of Turkey	float

== See also ==
- Currency
- Economy of Europe
- List of banks in Europe
- List of currencies in Europe
- List of European stock exchanges
