= Tirana Stock Exchange =

- Bursa e Tiranës
- Type: Stock Exchange
- Location: Tirana, Albania
- Founded: 1996
- Key people: Anila Fureraj (CEO)
- Currency: Lek
- No. of listings: 4
- Website: tse.com.al

The Tirana Stock Exchange (Albanian: Bursa e Tiranës) is a defunct stock exchange in Albania. It was located in the capital city, Tirana and abbreviated as TSE. The general manager of the stock exchange was Anila Fureraj.

== History ==
The TSE began operations as a department of Albania's central bank, the Bank of Albania, in 1996, concurrent with the establishment of the Albanian Securities Commission, with a full membership in the Federation of Euro-Asian Stock Exchanges (FEAS). The market functioned as a department of the central bank until it was spun off as an independent entity in 2002. It is not currently functional as it has been shut down since 2014.

== See also ==
- Economy of Albania
- List of stock exchanges
- List of European stock exchanges
