= Montenegro Stock Exchange =

Montenegrin stock exchange

- Type: Stock exchange
- Location: Podgorica, Montenegro
- Founded: 1993
- Owner: Publicly owned company
- Key people: Đorđe Đurđić (Chairman); MSc Gojko Maksimović (CEO)
- Currency: Euro
- No. of listings: 410 (January 2013)
- Market cap: US$3.87 billion (February 2013)
- Indices: MONEX20, MONEXPIF
- Website: www.mnse.me

The Montenegro Stock Exchange (MNSE) (Montenegrin: Montenegroberza AD) is a stock exchange located in Podgorica, Montenegro. It is Montenegro's only stock exchange.

The MNSE was founded 1993, and is a member of the World Federation of Exchanges, Federation of European Securities Exchanges and Federation of Euro-Asian Stock Exchanges. As of 10 January 2011, it fully incorporated NEX Stock Exchange, also in Podgorica, forming a single Montenegrin capital market.

Trading on the MNSE consists of short and long term securities, six investment funds, bonds, and shares from government funds portfolios. The MONEX20 and MONEXPIF are the principal stock indices of the Montenegro Stock Exchange.

== History ==
Montenegro Stock Exchange was established in June 1993, pursuant to the Law on Money and the Capital Market. The first shareholders of the Stock Exchange were the state itself and four national banks:

- Montenegrobanka A.D. Podgorica;
- Pljevaljska banka A.D. Pljevlja;
- Beranska banka A.D. Berane;
- Hipotekarna banka A.D. Podgorica

In 1995, the Montenegro Stock Exchange harmonized its business activities with the Law on Stock Exchange, Stock Exchange Activities and Agents. In the meantime, there has been a redefinition of the State of Yugoslavia and certain authority of the federal institutions were taken by the institutions established in the Republic of Montenegro.

Following the adoption of the Law on Securities, pursuant to its terms, the Montenegro Stock Exchange was recapitalized through the issue of new shares. After taking authority from Federal Commission of Yugoslavia for the Securities and Financial Markets, in December 2000, the Commission for Securities of the Republic of Montenegro, has given, after determining the fulfillment of all the necessary preconditions, the Montenegro Stock Exchange a business license.

In the period from 1994 to 2000, the Montenegro Stock Exchange traded mostly gyro money and short-term securities, as it was allowed by the existing legislation. The first brokerage houses in Montenegro were established in 1996, and those were CG Broker, Holder broker and Monte Adria Broker. The transfer of authority of regulating securities markets from the Former Republic of Yugoslavia to its member states required the adoption of the Montenegrin Law on Securities, which did not regulate the issue of short-term securities or trading with them. In this manner, following the adoption of the aforementioned Law, in Montenegro Stock Exchange are trading long-term debt and equity securities.

On 20 September 2001, six Montenegrin financial institutions and Brokers Business Association founded the New Securities Exchange of Montenegro. In this period, the activities on the Montenegro Stock Exchange were running very low (due to the failure to meet the legal requirements for trade in securities). Montenegro Stock Exchange completed the final harmonization with the Law on Securities Montenegro in 2004, which led to a situation in which, until the end of 2010, there were two stock exchanges operating. The start of operations of the New Securities Exchange of Montenegro is significant because for the first time in Montenegro capital market transaction were executing by electronic trading system.

In the beginning of 2011, the two Montenegrin stock exchanges were integrated, through the merge of the New Securities Exchange of Montenegro to the Montenegro Stock Exchange. The first working day on the single Montenegro Stock Exchange was 10 January 2011.

In overall shareholder structure of the Montenegro Stock Exchange twelve financial institutions from Montenegro participate with approximately of 93% ownership.

== See also ==
- Economy of Montenegro
- List of stock exchanges
- List of European stock exchanges
