= Gibraltar Stock Exchange =

Stock exchange in Europe

Coordinates: 36.14°N 5.35°W

- GSX
- Type: Stock exchange
- Location: Gibraltar city, Gibraltar
- Founded: 2014
- Closed: 2023
- Owner: Valereum Plc
- Key people: Simon Brickles chairman Nick Cowan CEO
- Currency: GBP
- Website: GSX

The Gibraltar Stock Exchange (GSX) was a stock exchange based in Gibraltar, a British overseas territory. until its closure in 2023.

== History ==
It was established in 2014, and began full operations in the first quarter of 2015. The stock exchange is the first fully licensed exchange in Gibraltar.

The opening occurred in two distinctive phases. In the initial "soft launch" phase from the start of November 2014, the GSX invited firms to apply for membership as Listing Members, with a number of applicants having expressed their keen interest. The full opening for listings themselves occurred during the first quarter of 2015.

With effect from August 2016, the UK's HM Revenue and Customs have designated the GSX as a "recognised stock exchange".

== Ownership ==
As of October 2021, Gibraltar based Valereum Plc ("Valereum") has an agreement to acquire 80% of GSX which was increased to 90% in February 2022. The deal is subject to Gibraltar Financial Services Commission (GFSC) approval. The deal is a catalyst for a robust regulatory framework with Anti-Money Laundering (AML) measures which will make Gibraltar a renowned jurisdiction with a world first and world beating stock exchange.

The deal with Valereum was completed in December 2023 with 100% ownership of the GX Group being exchanged for 5.0 million shares in Valereum and 10.0 million warrants, exercisable at 1 pence per share by December 2026.

== Operations ==
As of November 2023 there are no "funds" listed on GSX, listings solely comprise "Debt Security" listings

== See also ==
- List of stock exchanges
- List of European stock exchanges
- List of stock exchanges in the United Kingdom, the British Crown Dependencies and United Kingdom Overseas Territories
