= Macedonian Stock Exchange =

Coordinates: 42°0′0.55″N 21°25′30.67″E

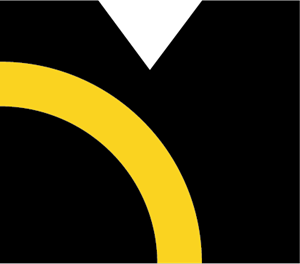
Logo of the MSE

The Macedonian Stock Exchange (MSE; Macedonian: Македонска берза, Makedonska berza) is the principal stock exchange in the Republic of North Macedonia, located in the capital city of Skopje. It was established in 1995 and the first trading occurred in 1996. The Macedonian Stock Exchange is a member of the Federation of Euro-Asian Stock Exchanges.

== Operations ==
=== Stock indices ===
Stock indices at the Macedonian Stock exchange include:

- MBI 10 (Macedonian Blue Chip Index)
- MBID (Macedonian Stock Exchange Index of publicly held companies)
- OMB (Bond Index)

== International Connectivity and Index Trackers ==
Passive exposure to the MBI 10 Index for international investors is possible through an exchange-traded fund - Expat Macedonia MBI10 UCITS ETF - listed in Frankfurt on Xetra (ticker MKK1, ISIN BGMACMB06181) and traded in euro. The fund acts as a conduit for capital flows between the international financial markets and the Macedonian capital market.

== See also ==
- Economy of the Republic of North Macedonia
- List of stock exchanges
- List of European stock exchanges
