= Cyprus Stock Exchange =

Stock exchange in Nicosia, Cyprus

- Χρηματιστήριο Αξιών Κύπρου; Kıbrıs Menkul Kıymetler Borsası
- Type: Stock Exchange
- Location: Nicosia, Cyprus
- Founded: 1996
- Currency: EUR
- Website: www.cse.com.cy

The Cyprus Stock Exchange (CSE; Greek: Χρηματιστήριο Αξιών Κύπρου or ΧΑΚ), is a stock exchange located in Cyprus. It is a public-sector entity under the direct control of the Cypriot government.

== History ==
CSE was established under the Cyprus Securities and Stock Exchange Law which provides for the development of the securities market in Cyprus and for the establishment and operation of the Cyprus Stock Exchange. It was passed by the House of Representatives in April 1993. Operations began on March 29 1996. In 2006, it launched a common platform with the Athens Stock Exchange. The exchange is a member of the Federation of Euro-Asian Stock Exchanges.

== Operations ==
The exchange allows private or public companies to list their bonds on the Emerging Companies Market (ECM) and for public companies to list their shares on the ECM. In both cases (listing of shares or bonds) the exchange will also provide the ISIN code and have the prices beamed through Bloomberg and Reuters terminals as both are official financial data vendors.

The CSE operates its own central securities depository.

== Supervision ==
The Cyprus Securities and Exchange Commission (CySEC) is responsible for the supervision and control of all CSE operations, the transactions carried out, its listed companies, brokers and brokerage firms.

== See also ==
- List of European stock exchanges
- List of Asian stock exchanges
- List of stock exchanges
- List of stock exchanges in the Commonwealth of Nations
