= Federation of Euro-Asian Stock Exchanges =

Non-profit international organization

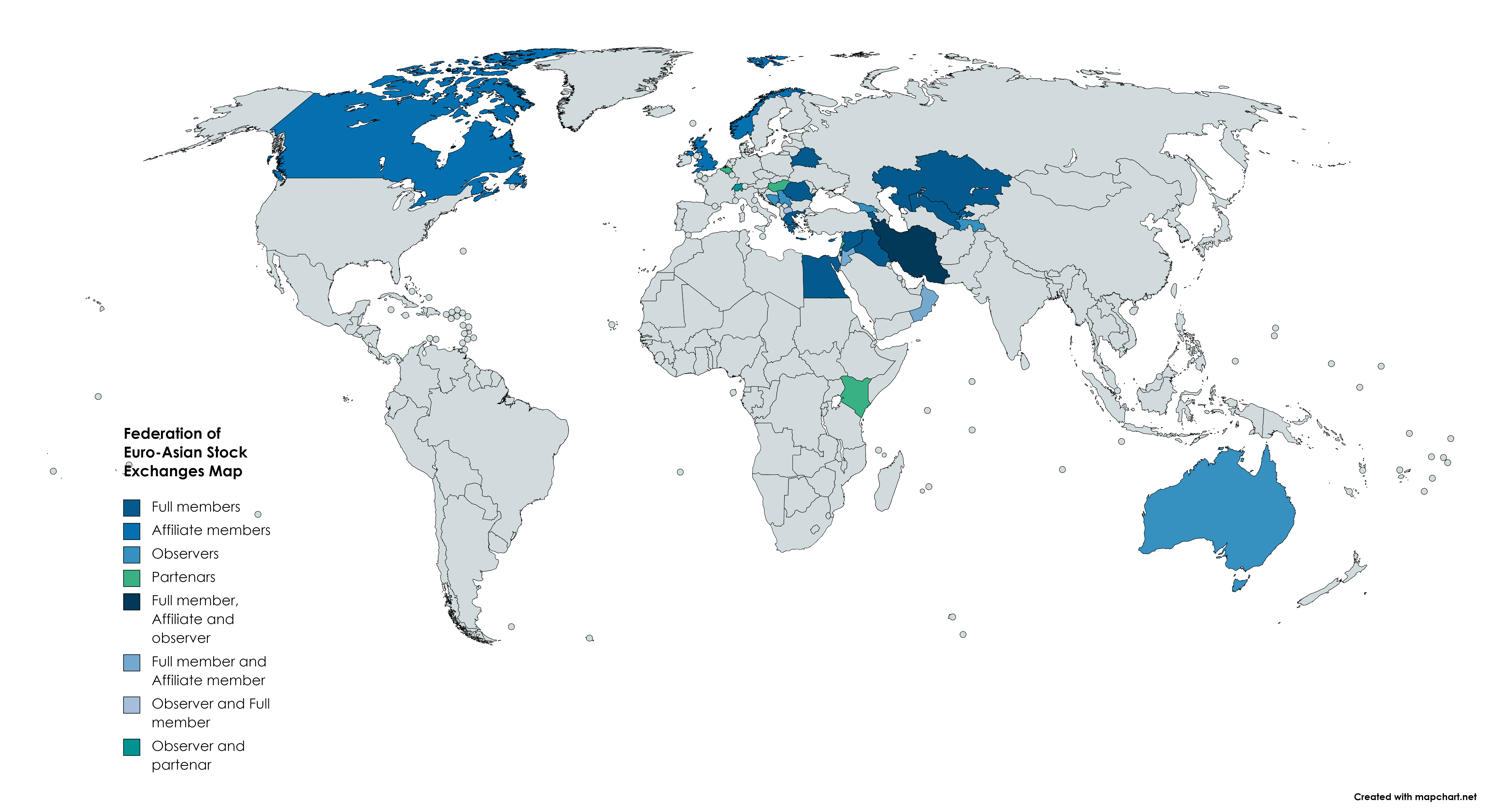
- Abbreviation: FEAS
- Formation: May 16, 1995; 31 years ago
- Type: Economic cooperation organization
- Headquarters: Yerevan, Armenia
- Location: International
- Members: 30
- Chairman: Radu Hanga
- CEO: Haitham Salim Al Salmi
- Secretary General: Konstantin Saroyan
- Website: feas.org

The Federation of Euro-Asian Stock Exchanges (FEAS) is a non-profit international organization comprising the main stock exchanges in Eastern Europe, the Middle East, and Central Asia. The purpose of the Federation is to contribute to the cooperation, development, support and promotion of capital markets in Eurasia, although membership in the Federation is open to markets internationally. It was established on 16 May 1995 with 12 founding members in Istanbul, Turkey. Currently, the FEAS has 30 members which include stock exchanges, post trade institutions, dealers associations, and regional federations from 29 countries. The Federation's headquarters are located in Yerevan, Armenia.

== Membership ==
=== Full members ===
Full members of the Federation of Euro-Asian Stock Exchanges, include:

- Armenia – Armenia Securities Exchange and the Central Depository of Armenia
- Belarus – Belarusian Currency and Stock Exchange
- Cyprus – Cyprus Stock Exchange
- Egypt – Egyptian Exchange and the Misr for Central Clearing, Depository and Registry
- Greece – Euronext Athens
- Iran – Iran Fara Bourse and the Tehran Stock Exchange
- Iraq – Iraq Stock Exchange
- Jordan – Amman Stock Exchange
- Kazakhstan – Astana International Exchange and the Kazakhstan Stock Exchange
- North Macedonia – Macedonian Stock Exchange
- Oman – Muscat Stock Exchange
- Palestine – Palestine Exchange
- Romania – Bucharest Stock Exchange
- Syria – Damascus Securities Exchange
- Uzbekistan – Tashkent Stock Exchange and the Uzbek Commodity Exchange

=== Affiliate members ===
Affiliate members of the Federation of Euro-Asian Stock Exchanges, include:

- Canada – Blockstation
- European Bank for Reconstruction and Development
- Georgia – Devexperts
- Iran – Central Securities Depository of Iran, Securities Exchange Brokers Association, and Tehran Stock Exchange Tech Mgmt Co
- Jordan – Securities Depository Center of Jordan
- Norway – Baymarkets
- Oman – Muscat Clearing & Depository
- United Kingdom – Percival

=== Observer members ===
Observer members of the Federation of Euro-Asian Stock Exchanges, include:

- Australia – Sydney Stock Exchange
- Bosnia and Herzegovina – Banja Luka Stock Exchange
- China – Asia–Europe Exchange
- Georgia – Georgian Stock Exchange
- Iran – Iran Mercantile Exchange
- Moldova – Moldova Stock Exchange
- North Macedonia – Central Securities Depository of Macedonia
- Scotland – Project Blackthorn
- Serbia – Belgrade Stock Exchange
- Switzerland – swissQuant
- Tajikistan – Central Asian Stock Exchange

=== Former observer members ===
- Scotland – Bourse Scot Limited (dissolved in 2019)

== Partnerships ==
The Federation of Euro-Asian Stock Exchanges also maintains various partnership agreements with several financial institutions, including:

- (Kenya) – African Securities Exchanges Association
- (Lebanon) – Arab Federation of Capital Markets
- (Hungary) – Association of Futures Markets
- (Belgium) – Association of National Numbering Agencies
- (United Nations) – Sustainable Stock Exchanges Initiative

== See also ==
- Central banks and currencies of Europe
- List of European stock exchanges
- List of stock exchanges
- List of stock exchanges in Western Asia
