= Saint Petersburg Stock Exchange =

Coordinates: 59.932947°N 30.256155°E

SPB Exchange
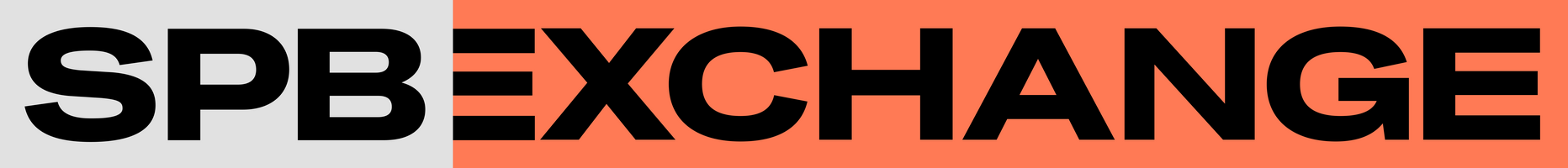
- Type: Stock exchange
- Location: Saint Petersburg, Russian Federation
- Founded: 1997
- Key people: Evgeny Serdyukov, CEO (since November 2023)
- Currency: Russian Ruble
- Volume: US$37.53 billion (June 2021)
- Website: spbexchange.ru

SPB Exchange (Russian: СПБ Биржа, formerly JSC "Saint-Petersburg Exchange") is a stock exchange located in Saint Petersburg, Russia. It is the only other stock exchange in Russia after Moscow Exchange.

== History ==
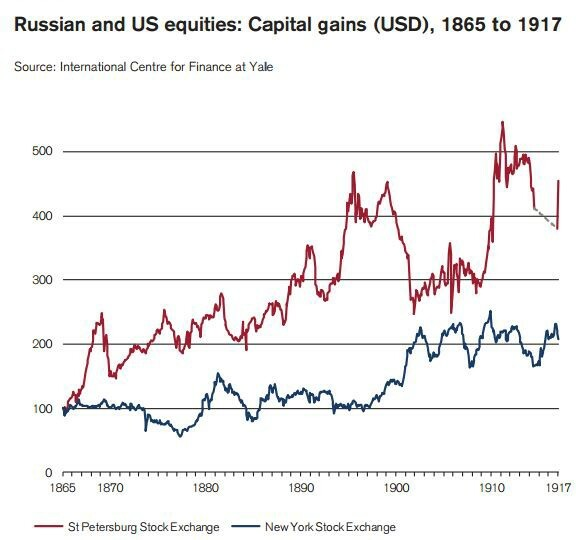
Indexed trends of the Russian and US equities (1865 - 1917).

During the Russian Empire era, there was already an homonymous stock exchange (located in a specific building), but was later shut down in 1917.

In 1997, Non-Profit Partnership “Saint Petersburg Stock Exchange” was created and became the first licensed stock exchange in Russia, with NP RTS as one of its partners. In the same year, Non-Profit Partnership “Saint Petersburg Stock Exchange” launched an electronic derivative trading platform and, by 2000, it became the leading derivatives exchange in Russia. In 2014, foreign equity securities trading started on SPB Exchange platform. By the end of 2017, all the equity securities in the S&P 500 Index became available for trading on SPB platform and a T+2 settlement cycle to match the cycle of U.S. exchanges was also introduced the same year. In July 2021 the exchange changed its name to Public Joint-Stock Company "SPB Exchange". SPB Exchange is the legal successor of the Stock exchange “Saint-Petersburg”.

In November 2023, the US Treasury added SPB Exchange to the sanctions list, after which it suspended trading in American securities. Two weeks later, a bankruptcy filing for SPBSE appeared in the files of the Moscow Arbitration Court. After that, its shares fell by 34%. The exchange responded with a denial; the source of the statement is unknown. The arbitration court did not accept the claim, and the Central Bank began an investigation.

=== History of the Saint-Petersburg Exchange ===
The Stock exchange “Saint-Petersburg” was founded in accordance with requirements of the Federal Law “On Securities Market” on the basis of stock exchange department of CJSC “Exchange “Saint-Petersburg” in April 1997, having received Stock Exchange License No.1 in Russia from Financial Markets Federal Agency. In accordance with Russian Federation Government order No.654 the Stock exchange “Saint-Petersburg” became one of the four stock exchanges, authorized to organize trades of JSC "Gazprom" shares.

=== Stock Market in JSC “Saint-Petersburg Exchange” ===
Open Joint-Stock Company “Saint-Petersburg Exchange” became the legal successor of Stock exchange “Saint-Petersburg” and continued to trade JSC “Gazprom” shares for all its participants. Today, JSC “Saint-Petersburg” is the only exchange which has JSC “Gazprom” shares in its listing.

=== Derivatives Market in JSC “Saint-Petersburg Exchange” ===
In February 2011, JSC “Saint-Petersburg exchange” and JSC “RTS Stock Exchange” carried out a joint project on organization of trading of commodities futures.

== See also ==
- Old Saint Petersburg Stock Exchange and Rostral Columns (old buildings)
