= Moldova Stock Exchange =

Stock exchange in Moldova

- Type: Stock exchange
- Location: Chișinău, Moldova
- Founded: 1994
- Indices: EVM Composite Index
- Website: www.bvm.md

The Moldova Stock Exchange (Romanian: Bursa de Valori a Moldovei) is the only stock exchange in Moldova. Founded in 1994, the exchange now has 17 financial service providers that act as members and participants. As of July 2026, 13 companies are listed on the regulated market, while 15 companies are listed on the ATS marketplace operated by the exchange.

== History ==
The Moldova Stock Exchange was founded in 1994. The exchange is subject to the supervision and regulation of the National Commission for Financial Markets (CNPF) of the Republic of Moldova.

In 2025, the Bucharest Stock Exchange, it established the Chișinău Stock Exchange in the country's capital as a second trading center. The exchange, officially named the International Stock Exchange of Moldova (ISEM) will serve as a competitor to the Moldova Stock Exchange and is expected to launch in late 2026.

== Index ==
The EVM Composite Index tracks the performance of listed equities.

== Membership ==
The exchange is a member of:

- Euro-Asian Federation of Exchanges (observing member)

== Listed companies ==
The following companies were listed on the Moldova Stock Exchange in early 2025:

- Arria Trade Corporation
- FinComBank
- Floarea Soarelui
- Moldasig
- Comertbank
- Energbank
- EuroCreditBank
- Moldindconbank
- Victoriabank
- Moldova Agroindbank
- Acord Grup
- OTP Bank
- Moldcargo
