= Faroese Securities Market =

Faroese Securities Market (Faroese: Virðisbrævamarknaður Føroya) is a stock exchange in the Faroe Islands that was founded in 2000; the technical operation of the market is done by the Iceland Stock Exchange. The market allows trading on Faroe Island stocks and bonds.

== History ==
The discussion on establishing a Faroese securities market began in 1997 after the report "Stock Market and Equity Issues" (Partabrævamarknaður og eginpeningsviðurskifti) was published. This report concluded that there was a need for a Faroese stock exchange. Although Faroese could list their shares on the Copenhagen stock exchange and others, this had not happened. The suspected reasons are:

1. The Copenhagen stock exchange was considered too big for Faroese companies
2. No support was provided to Faroese companies to get them listed on the stock market
3. Interest on deposits at Faroese banks were taxed very low, which made it attractive to maintain cash deposits with guaranteed return

There were efforts to issue bonds. The Faroe Islands government, which has issued bonds on the Copenhagen stock exchange since 1994, had the most experience in this area. However, these bonds were little traded and illiquid. Therefore, it was concluded in 1997 that it would be best to set up a stock exchange for both stocks and bonds in the Faroe Islands. The first listing on the Faroese Securities Market was the government bonds in late 2003.
