= Georgian Stock Exchange =

Stock exchange in Tbilisi, Georgia

Logo

The Georgian Stock Exchange (Georgian: საქართველოს საფონდო ბირჟა, literally "Georgian Stock Exchange Market") is the principal stock exchange in the country of Georgia. It was created by the "Joint Stock Company Georgian Stock Exchange Charter" which was registered and approved in 1999. It is located in the capital city of Tbilisi and its abbreviation in English is GeSE. The Georgian Stock Exchange is a member of the Federation of Euro-Asian Stock Exchanges.

== See also ==
- Economy of Georgia
- List of stock exchanges
- List of European stock exchanges
- Caufex Electronic Commodities and Derivatives Exchange
