= Belarusian Currency and Stock Exchange =

Stock exchange in Minsk, Belarus

- Беларуская валютна-фондавая біржа Белорусская валютно-фондовая биржа
- Type: Open joint-stock company
- Location: 48A Surganova Street, Minsk, Belarus
- Founded: 20 July 1998
- Owner: National Bank of the Republic of Belarus
- Key people: Andrei Aukhimenia (President)
- Currency: Belarusian ruble (BYN)
- Website: www.bcse.by

The Belarusian Currency and Stock Exchange (BCSE; Belarusian: Беларуская валютна-фондавая біржа; Russian: Белорусская валютно-фондовая биржа) is a currency and stock exchange based in Belarus.

== History ==
The exchange was formed in 1998 in accordance with the Decree of the President of Belarus from 20 July 1998 No.366 "On perfection of system of state regulation of the stock market". The founders of the stock exchange were the National Bank of the Republic of Belarus (a controlling share holding), State Property Fund of the Ministry of Economics of the Republic of Belarus and a number of large banks of the Republic of Belarus.

== Management ==
The supreme body of management of the Belarusian currency and stock exchange is the General meeting of shareholders. The structure of the BCSE shareholders, except for its founders, includes banks, broker/dealer subsidiaries of the republic, etc. The Management of the BCSE between the General meetings of shareholders is carried out by the Supervisory council.

BCSE carries out functions of organization of trades, function of the operator of settlement-clearing system, settlement depository, an information centre and also carries out registration of the transactions concluded on the over-the-counter market. In addition, the BCSE performs the function of supporting indicative quotations on assets traded outside the trading floor, and acts as a central registrar of information about OTC securities transactions.

== Associations ==
The Belarusian Currency and Stock Exchange is a member of the following associations:

- International Association of Exchanges of the Commonwealth of Independent States countries (IAEx of CIS)
- Federation of Euro-Asian Stock Exchanges (FEAS)
- Association of Belarusian banks (ABB)

It is also a partner exchange of the UN's Sustainable Stock Exchanges Initiative.
