= Börse München =

Stock exchange in Germany

Coordinates: 48°08′40.90″N 11°34′11.43″E

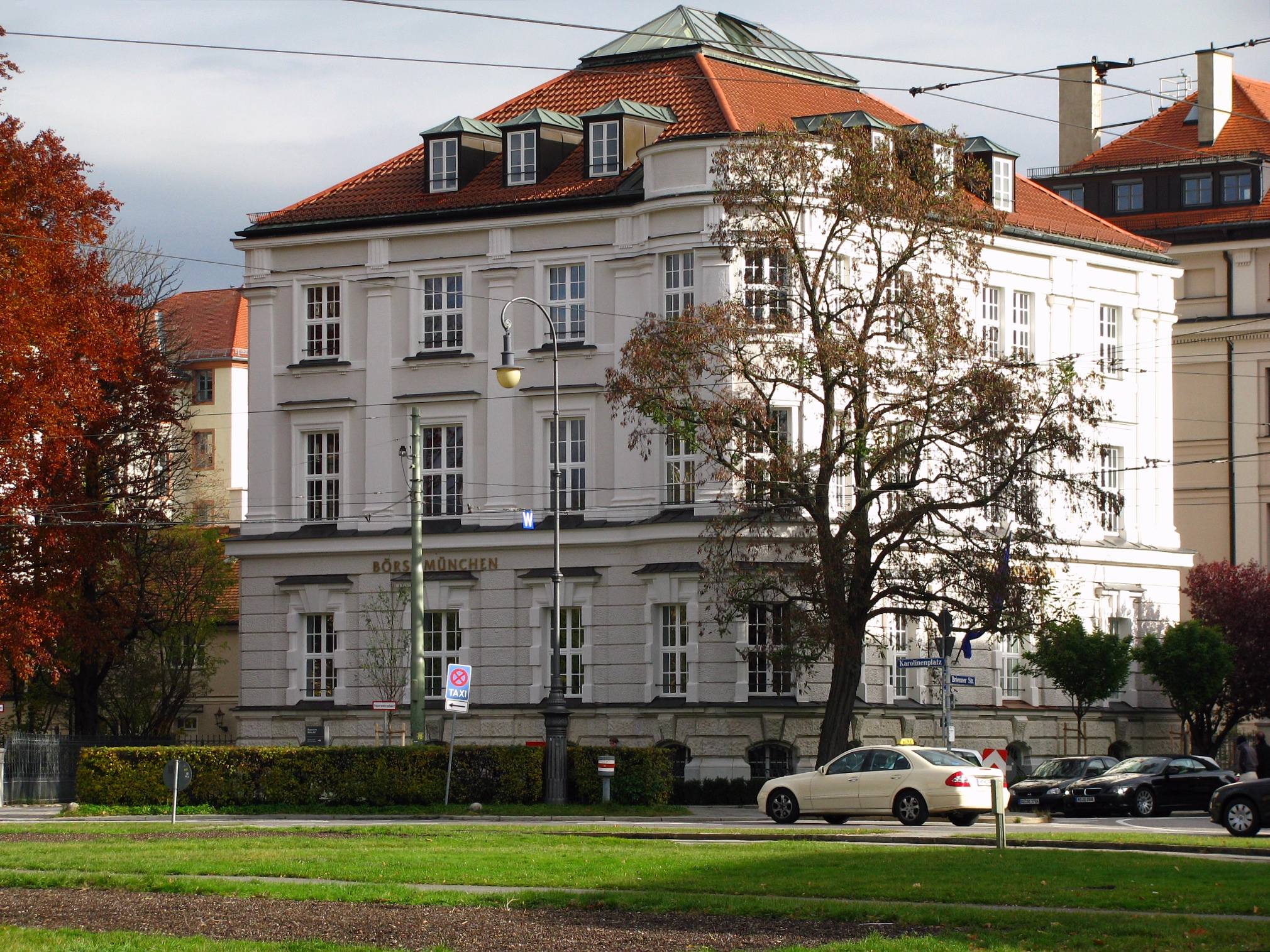
Börse München

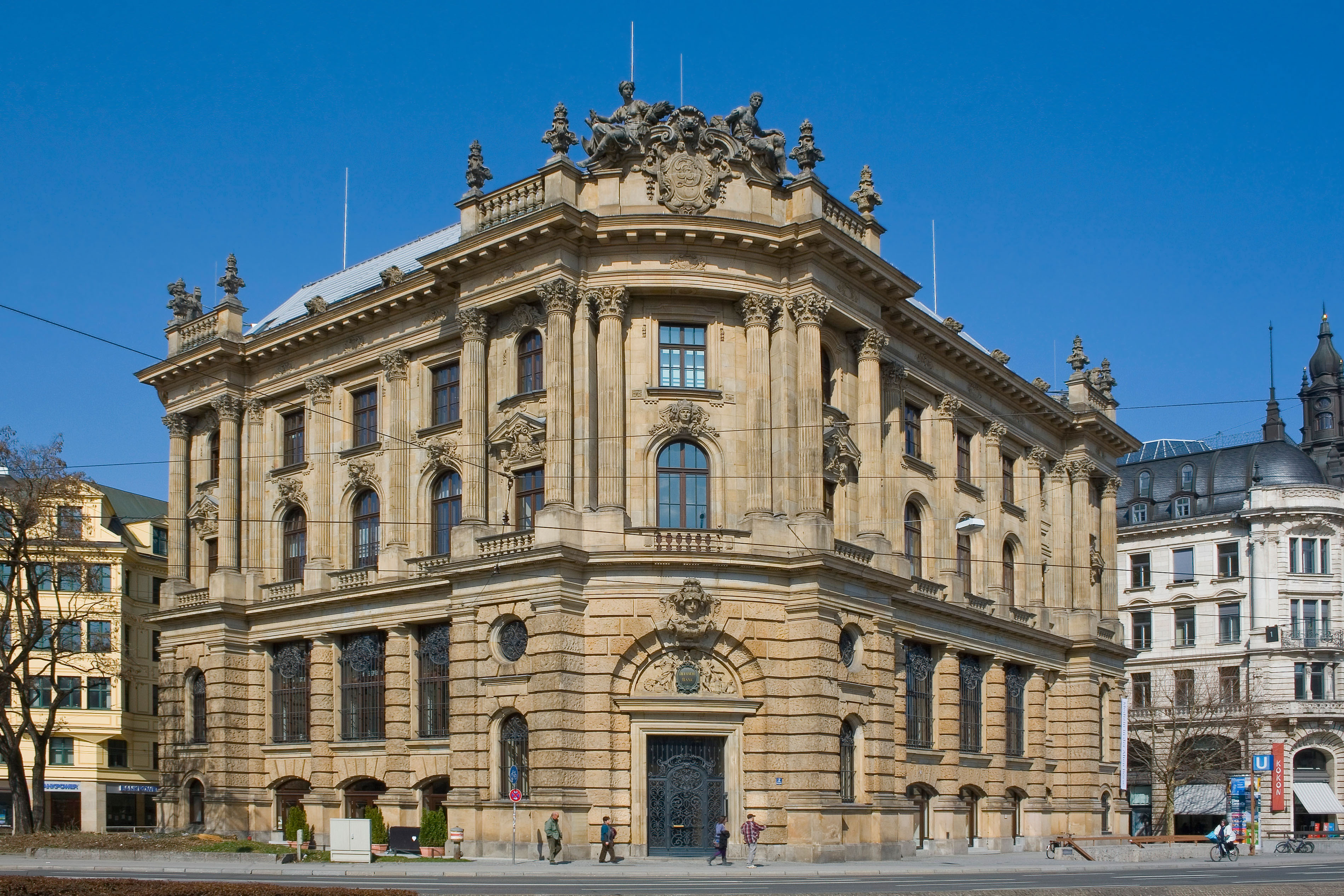
Former Börse München at Lenbachplatz

The Börse München is a stock exchange based in Munich, Germany. Founded in 1830, it currently lists over 6300 securities.

== History ==
The Börse München was officially founded in 1869, but its origins go back to the 1830s, when traders from Munich started meeting regularly to trade securities. It was closed during World War I, but reopened in 1918. In 1935 it merged with the stock exchange of Augsburg to form the Bayerische Börse. Finally in 2003 the name reverted to Börse München, to follow the convention to name stock exchanges after the city they are based in. It was moved from a palatial building at Lenbachplatz to Karolinenplatz at Brienner Straße.
