= Climate change in the Netherlands =

Emissions, impacts and responses of the Netherlands related to climate change

Sea level rise is measured by Copernicus satellites

The Netherlands is already affected by climate change. The average temperature in the Netherlands rose by more than 2 °C from 1901 to 2020. Climate change has resulted in increased frequency of droughts and heatwaves. Because significant portions of the Netherlands have been reclaimed from the sea or otherwise are very near sea level, the Netherlands is very vulnerable to sea level rise.

The Netherlands has the fourth largest greenhouse gas emissions per capita of the European Union, in part due to the large number of cows. The Dutch government has set goals to lower emissions in the next few decades. The Dutch response to climate change is driven by a number of unique factors, including larger green recovery plans by the European Union in the face of the COVID-19 and a climate change litigation case, State of the Netherlands v. Urgenda Foundation, which created mandatory climate change mitigation through emissions reductions 25% below 1990 levels. In 2021 CO_{2} emissions were down 14% compared to 1990 levels. The goal of the Dutch government is to reduce emissions in 2030 by 49%.

== Greenhouse gas emissions ==
In the Netherlands, scientists consider the continued increasing concentrations of greenhouse gasses in the atmosphere as the main cause of climate change. Through the process of global warming, the temperature rises, and as a result, the sea level rises as well. In an effort to reduce greenhouse gas emissions, the Dutch government takes mitigation measures and cooperates with non-state actors. The Dutch government also takes adaption measures to protect the country against the consequences of climate change.

The Netherlands goals in the reduction of greenhouse gas emission were laid down in the Climate Act on May 28, 2019. The Climate Plan, the National Energy and Climate Plan (NECP) and the National Climate Agreement contain the policy and measures to achieve these climate goals. The National Climate Agreement, which was concluded at June 2019, contains agreements with the sectors on what they will do to help achieve the climate goals. The participating sectors are: electricity, industry, built environment, traffic and transport, and agriculture. In this act the Dutch government stated that it wants to reduce the Netherlands' greenhouse gas emissions by 49% by 2030, compared to 1990 levels, and a 95% reduction by 2050.

=== European Green Deal ===
On the 11th of December 2019 the President of the European Commission, Ursula von der Leyen, presented the European Green Deal. This Green Deal is a growth strategy to transform the EU in a climate neutral and circular economy, while preserving Europe's competitiveness.

On July 14, 2021, the European Commission presented the first proposals of its "Fit-for-55" package The package of proposals aims at providing a coherent and balanced framework for reaching the target of 55 percent reduction in 2030, while:

- ensuring a just and socially fair transition
- maintaining and strengthening innovation and competitiveness of EU industry while ensuring a level playing field vis-à-vis third country economic operators
- underpinning the EU's position as leading the way in the global fight against climate change

The European Commission, the European Parliament and the Member States are currently negotiating on the proposals in this package. The Netherlands pushes for a quick completion of these negotiations, while maintaining the overall ambition of the proposals to ensure it continues to add up to 55 percent reduction.

=== Emissions ===
The following table shows the yearly total emission of greenhouse gas in the Netherlands in million tonnes of carbon dioxide equivalent (Mt CO_{2}-equivalent), and values for EU27 and the world for comparison.

Greenhouse gas emissions (Mt CO_{2}-equivalent)
Year	Netherlands	EU27 (Note: The countries of the EU after the UK exit.)	Global total	Netherlands as % of global
1990	228.34	4915.14	33268.12	0.69%
2000	229.77	4513.34	36991.71	0.62%
2005	226.13	4597.10	42318.43	0.53%
2015	208.38	3922.02	50134.38	0.41%
2020	176.88	3427.44	50632.31	0.35%
2021	178.70	3617.74	53056.61	0.34%
2022	167.85	3587.80	53786.04	0.31%

For the total Greenhouse gas emissions in 2022, that is, including other Greenhouse gases and land use, at 167.85 million tonnes, the Netherlands ranked 43 out of 208 countries, below the Kuwait 167.86 million tonnes and above Sudan (including South Sudan) 146.96 million tonnes, while Kuwait has a much smaller and Sudan a much larger population than the Netherlands. From these figures for the yearly emissions for the Netherlands, as well as the yearly global emissions, it can be seen that the Netherlands accounts for 0.31% of the global emissions. As the comparison above, Kuwait is found to account for 0.31% and Sudan for 0.27% of the yearly global emissions.

The following table shows the yearly total emission of greenhouse gas in the Netherlands in tonnes of carbon dioxide per capita, and values for EU27 and the world for comparison.

Greenhouse gas emissions/capita (t CO_{2}-equivalent/capita)
Year	Netherlands	EU27	World
1990	15.26	11.70	6.24
2000	14.43	10.54	6.02
2005	13.82	10.56	6.47
2010	13.45	9.71	6.75
2015	12.30	8.87	6.79
2020	10.30	7.73	6.50
2021	10.37	8.15	6.74
2022	9.72	8.09	6.76

For the 2022 per capita greenhouse gas emissions in the Netherlands, at 9.72 tonnes per capita, the Netherlands ranked 42 out of 208 countries. This is below Belgium 9.74 tonnes per capita but above Germany 9.49 tonnes per capita.

=== Large emitters in the Netherlands ===
The IJmuiden steel plant was in 2021 the biggest polluter in the Netherlands, emitting around six million metric tons of CO_{2}. This was followed by the Eemshaven Power plant, at 5.31 million metric tons of carbon dioxide. Meanwhile, Shell owned two of the ten biggest emitters in the Netherlands. That same year, global carbon dioxide emissions from Shell stood at around 58 million metric tons in total.

Greenhouse gas emissions are relatively high in the Netherlands, contributing 4.5 percent to the EU's total. The Dutch emit 34 percent more greenhouse gases per capita than the average European. Emissions are related to the size of the economy, which in the Netherlands is relatively large per capita. Emission intensity is a measure of how much greenhouse gas is emitted per euro of gross domestic product (GDP). The emission intensity of the Dutch economy is comparable to the EU average. Seventeen EU countries, mainly in Eastern Europe, have a higher emission intensity than the Netherlands. The fact that the Netherlands has a relatively low emissions relative to its GDP is partly linked to high net imports of electricity and the relatively large size of the service sector.

Emissions (mt CO_{2}eq)
Sector	1990	1995	2000	2005	2010	2011	2012	2013	2014	2015	2016	2017	2018	2019
Agriculture	23.12	22.33	19.88	18.52	19.05	18.79	18.81	19.02	19.58	20.36	20.33	19.41	18.01	18.29
Land-use change and forestry	1.48	1.47	1.44	1.11	1.12	1.37	1,37	1.37	1.37	1.37	1.36	1.36	1.36	1.36
Waste	14,16	12,48	9,71	6,26	4,47	4,19	3,96	3,76	3,52	3,32	3,13	3,01	2,88	2,76
Industry	15,56	17,04	13,05	8,64	4,23	3,98	3,86	3,87	3,76	3,82	3,8	3,68	3,43	3,04
Manufacturing and construction	29,26	25,91	24,46	24,75	23,87	23	23,95	23,22	22,89	23,22	24,92	25,77	25,47	24,83
Transport	27,72	30,31	32,88	35,24	34,91	35,02	33,52	32,63	30,25	30,73	30,92	31,59	31,7	31,28
Electricity and heat	52,98	65,94	67,21	71,52	71,39	68,06	65,22	65,20	68,47	73,18	71,76	68,19	63,98	61,55
Buildings	28,88	32,02	28,57	28,54	33,32	26,18	28,41	29,65	22,58	24,34	25,01	24,5	24,31	23,19
Fugitive emissions	0,59	0,52	0,37	0,41	0,45	0,42	0,42	0,45	0,37	0,31	0,3	0,28	0,25	0,24
Other fuel combustion	10,08	10,64	9,83	8,86	8,83	7,7	7,58	7,60	6,77	7,16	7,17	6,92	7,23	7,05
Aviation and shipping	39,89	42,64	51,7	60,6	54,27	58,07	53,8	52,20	51,96	49,27	49,32	48,96	47,63	49,55

=== Energy consumption ===
With a 29.7% share of the total greenhouse gas emission, energy industries accounted for the largest share of the Netherlands' GHG emissions in 2019. Emissions from energy industries fell by 15% in the 2005-2019 period, representing a slight decrease of 0.6 percentage points in their share of total emissions. In 2020, the country proposed a minimum carbon price for electricity generation starting at €12.3/tCO_{2} which would rise 159% up to 2030. In 2021, a carbon tax for the industry has been introduced, starting at €30/tCO_{2} with a linear increase of €125 to €150/tCO_{2} in 2030, including the ETS price.

During the COVID-19 pandemic all sectors in the Netherlands reduced their emissions. The biggest emissions reduction was in the waste management sector, which reduced its share of total emissions over the period from 2.8% to 1.5%. This translates into a 55% reduction in emissions since 2005. Emissions from industrial processes and product use (-33.7%), transport (-12.5%), 'other emissions' (buildings and tertiary sector, -10.4%), agriculture (-2.3%) and manufacturing industries and construction (-0.6%) fell between 2005 and 2019.

The most important figure in the energy balance of the Netherlands is the total consumption of 109.80 billion kWh of electric energy per year. Per capita this is an average of 6,262 kWh.

The Netherlands aim to be self-sufficient with domestically produced energy. The total production of all electric energy producing facilities is 118 bn kWh, which is 107% of the country's own usage. Despite this, the Netherlands trade energy with foreign countries. Along with pure consumption, the production, imports and exports play an important role. Other energy sources, such as natural gas or crude oil are also used.

== Impacts on the natural environment ==
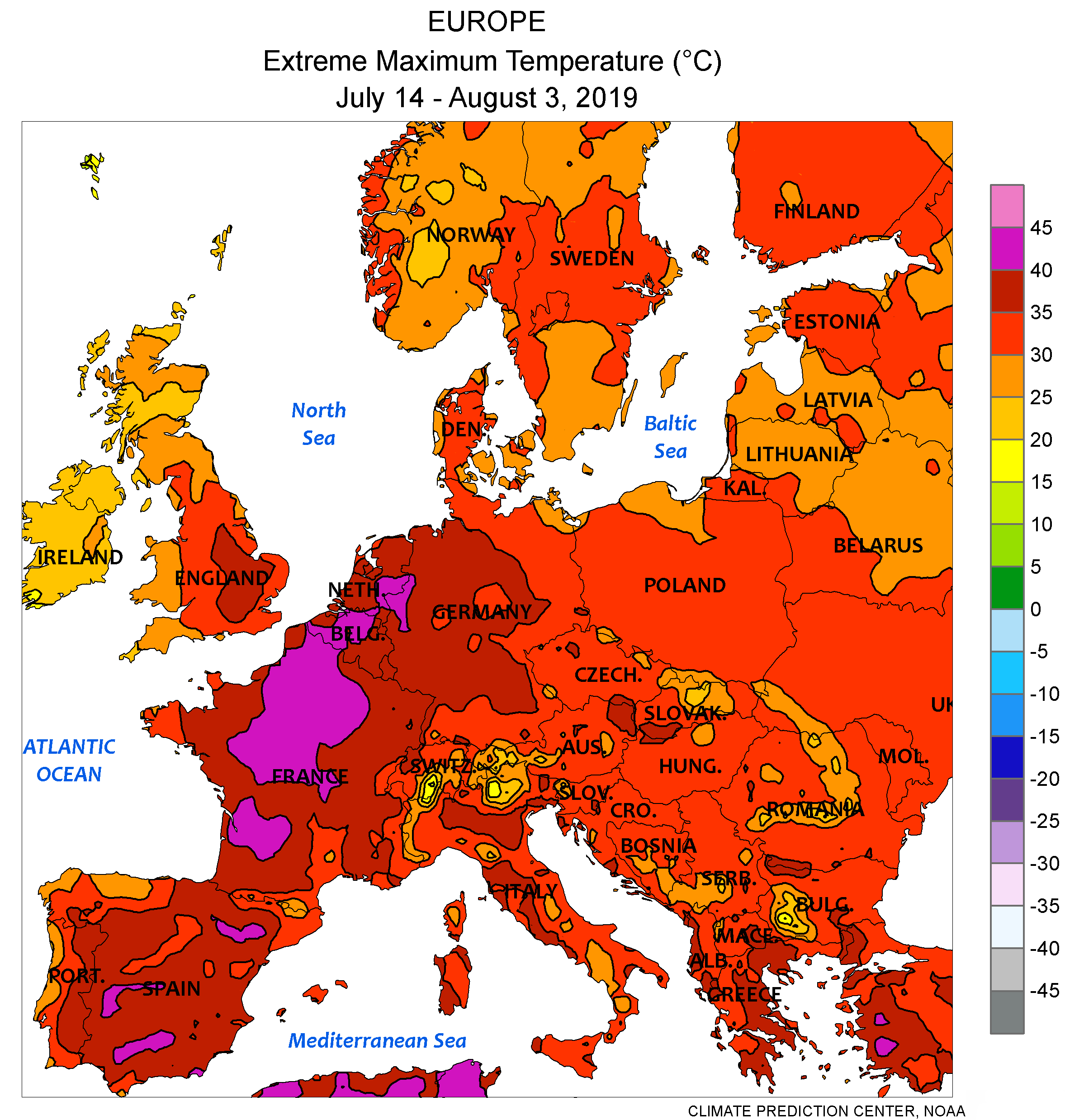
The July 2019 European heat wave affected the Netherlands heavily, with temperatures over 40°C

The temperature has risen by an average of 1 degrees Celsius globally in the last 130 years, while in The Netherlands the average temperature has risen by 1.7 degrees Celsius in that time. The sea level has risen 20 centimetres.

=== Temperature and weather changes ===
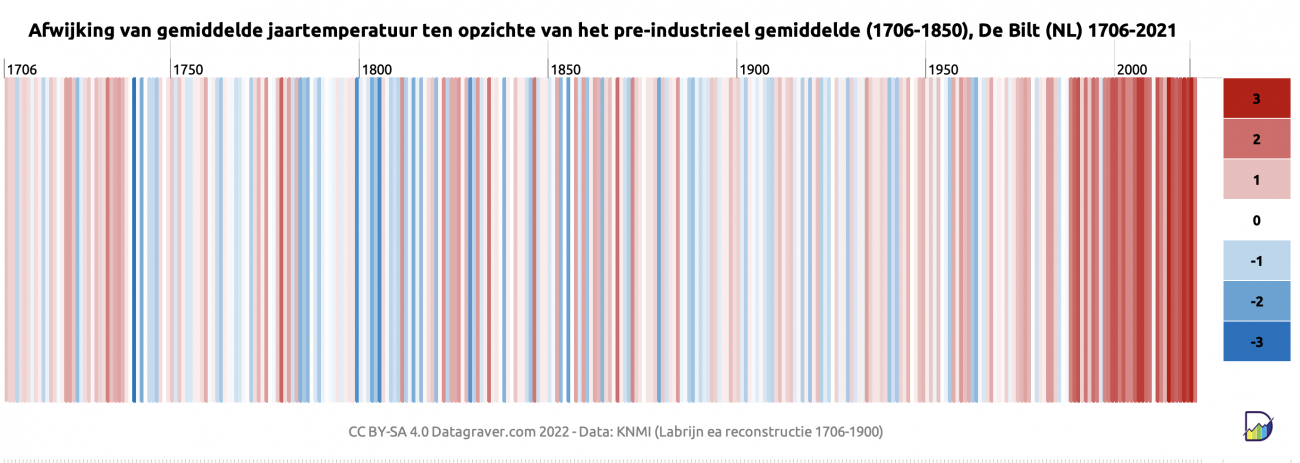
Barcode temperature deviation yearly compared to pre industrial average

Köppen climate classification map for the Netherlands for 1980–2016

2071–2100 map under the most intense climate change scenario. Mid-range scenarios are currently considered more likely

The top 5 of the highest average temperature in a year were all in the last two decades with 2014 having the highest average temperature of 11.7 degrees Celsius. The last 121 years the Royal Netherlands Meteorological Institute has kept record of the heatwaves in The Netherlands, 29 heatwaves have occurred since then, 14 heatwaves have occurred in the last 21 years. Five heatwaves have occurred during the last 3 years with 2018 and 2019 having two heatwaves a year. In the first heatwave of 2019 there was a record temperature of 40.7 degrees Celsius in Gilze en Rijen. The last few years heatwaves have been stronger than expected. Scientists expected that temperatures would increase 1.5 degrees Celsius during a heatwave but when measured it points out that it is actually 3 degrees Celsius.

In the summer of 2018, there was a big drought. 2018 is one of the top 5 years with the lowest rainfall in The Netherlands, with it having a shortage of 309 millimetres of rain. The drought had the biggest impact inland and less of an impact in the coastal areas. 2019 was also drier than it would be normally.

The annual precipitation has increased by 8% between 1961 and 2020 mostly during the winter and summer precipitation has increased, only during the spring a decrease was found, the increase in precipitation has mostly stopped since 2000. Days that recorded a minimum temperature of below 0 °C has decreased by two weeks annually in the same period, the number of days that recorded a maximum temperature below 0 °C has decreased by 5 days annually.

=== Sea level rise ===
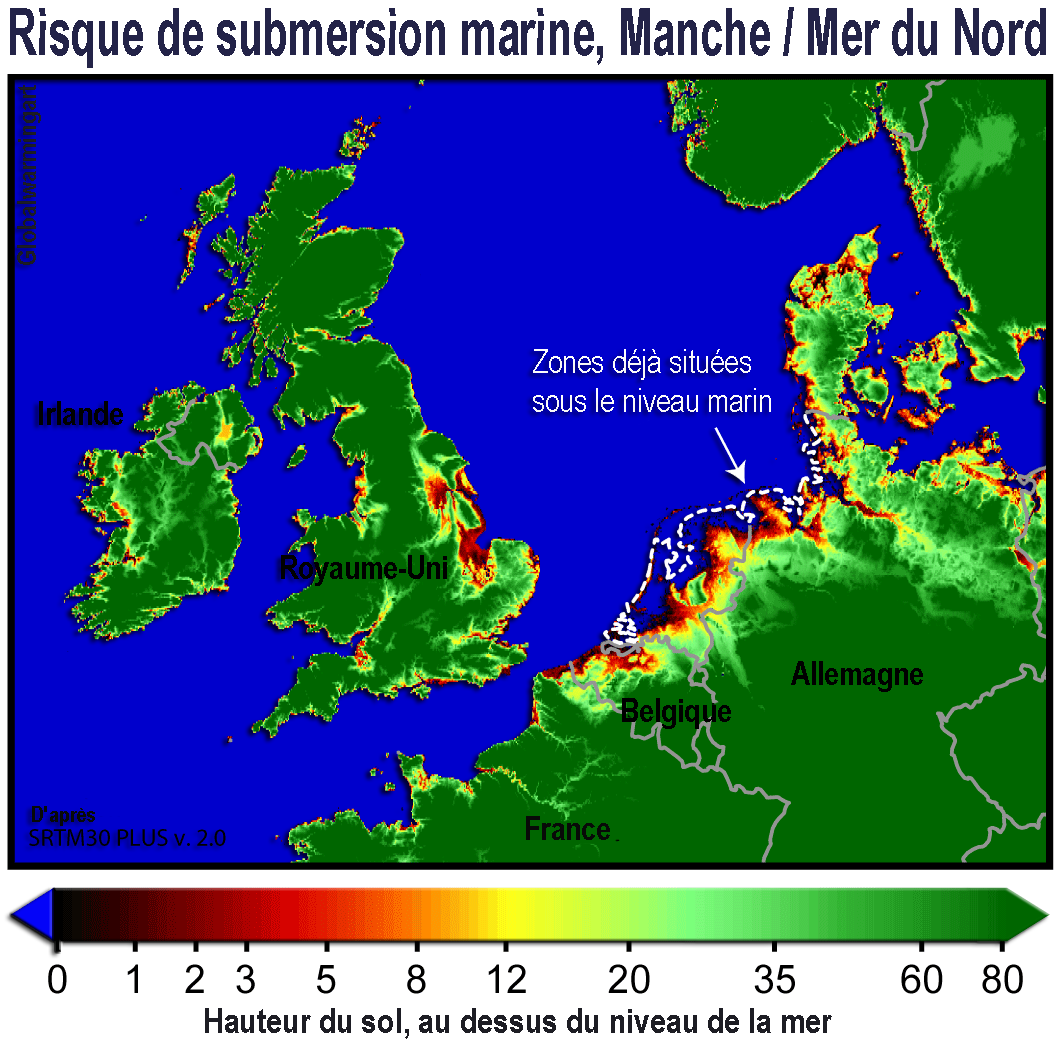
North Sea: sea level risks

The sea level has risen about 12 to 20 centimeters from 1902 to 2010. The rate at which the sea level is rising has increased. In the last few years, it has risen twice as fast compared to the 20th century, with a rise of 4 to 5 millimeters every year. The rate at which the sea level is rising is still increasing. The KNMI researched that in the worst-case scenario sea levels would increase 54–121 cm in 2100 that would happen if the CO_{2} emissions would double by 2050 and at the end of the century temperature would have risen to 4.4 °C. In the second best scenario sea levels would rise to 30–81 cm by the end of the century if net zero would be reached after 2050 and a stabilisation of 1.8 °C at the end of the century. sea level rise The Dutch government says that the current protection is adequate until 2050.

Sea level rise in different SSPs in comparison with 1995-2014
Temperature increase 2100	2050	2100
Stabilisation of 1.8 °C (SSP1-2.6)	14–38 cm	30–81 cm
Net zero by end of the century, 2.7 °C (SSP2-4.5)	15–41 cm	39–94 cm
Worst-case scenario 4.4 °C (SSP5-8.5)	16–47 cm	54–121 cm

If the sea level rises as much as it is projected the consequences will be severe, this is due to a huge part of the country already being under the current sea level and if it rises even more the risk of flooding will increase. To prevent floods from happening the Netherlands have developed a programme called the "Delta Works" which is a series of construction projects all over the south-western Netherlands that is focused to protect the country from floods.

The delta works is a huge network of constructions that all help to prevent any floods from occurring. The programme started in 1954 and consists of a variety of dams, sluices, dykes and storm surge barriers. Thanks to the programme hundreds of kilometers of dykes and levees have been reinforced to be better equipped at the event of a flood. Other bigger and more advanced structures such as the Maeslantkering, a storm surge barrier controlled by a computer to automatically close if the Rotterdam port is threatened by a flood, have been constructed as safety measures. The Maeslantkering have luckily only been needed to close once during a storm in 2007 when they wanted to test how effective it would be under storming conditions.

The Delta works was finished in 1997 with the construction of the Maeslantkering and another storm surge barrier called Hartelkering. Since then there has been no new construction built as a part of the Delta works. Even though no new constructions were made, it does not mean that the work has stopped. As of 2022 the now called Delta Programme is still working annually to assess and reinforce existing flood protections. In 2022 22 km of dikes were upgraded to better prevent future floods.

The Dutch government has acknowledged that even though the situation is stable now, the alarming rate of which the sea level is rising will be of a huge concern in the future and there is work needed to be done to prohibit catastrophes in the future. Their objective with the Delta Programme is that by 2050 on average 50 km of flood protection needs to be upgraded annually as there is approximately 1500 km of dike in need of upgrades to meet the current day standard by 2050.

== Mitigation ==
=== Policies and legislation to achieve mitigation and mitigation approaches ===
The Dutch government has signed numerous climate agreements, such as:

- United Nations Framework Convention on Climate Change in 1992
- Kyoto Protocol was signed in 1997 (the Kyoto protocol was ongoing in 2008–2012, had a target to reduce global emissions 8% from 1990. The Netherlands target for GHG emissions for the period 2008–2012 was −6% changes in emissions from the base year (1990) and the result was −6.3%.)
- Paris Agreement was signed in 2015

==== Paris Agreement ====
The Paris Agreement is a legally binding international agreement. Its main goal is to limit global warming to below 1.5 degrees Celsius, compared to pre-industrial levels. The Nationally Determined Contributions (NDC's) are the plans to fight climate change adapted for each country. Every party in the agreement has different targets based on its own historical climate records and country's circumstances and all the targets for each country are stated in their NDC.

In the long-term low GHG emission development strategies (LT-LEDS) the Netherlands have chosen to focus on one main target, cut its greenhouse gas emissions by 49% by 2030. As an interim target to the climate act the Netherlands must reduce its greenhouse gas emissions by 95% by 2050 compared to 1990.

==== Carbon tax and related taxes ====
The Netherlands initiated a carbon tax in 1990. However, in 1992, it was replaced with a 50/50 carbon/energy tax called the Environmental Tax on Fuels. The taxes are assessed partly on carbon content and partly on energy content. The charge was transformed into a tax and became part of general tax revenues. The general fuel tax is collected on all hydrocarbon fuels. Fuels used as raw materials are not subject to the tax.

In 1996, the Regulatory Tax on Energy, another 50/50 carbon/energy tax, was implemented. The environmental tax and the regulatory tax are 5.16 Dutch guilder, or NLG (~$3.13), or per tonne of CO_{2} and 27.00 NLG (~$16.40) per tonne CO_{2} respectively. Under the general fuel tax, electricity is not taxed, though fuels used to produce electricity are taxable. Energy-intensive industries initially benefited from preferential rates under this tax, but the benefit was canceled in January 1997. Since 1997, nuclear power has been taxed under the general fuel tax at the rate of NLG 31.95 per gram of uranium-235.38

In 2007, the Netherlands introduced a Waste Fund that is funded by a carbon-based packaging tax. This tax was both used to finance government spending and to finance activities to help reach the goals of recycling 65% of used packaging by 2012. The organization Nedvang (Nederland van afval naar grondstof or The Netherlands from waste to value) was set up in 2005. It supports producers and importers of packaged goods. This decree was signed in 2005 and states that producers and importers of packaged goods are responsible for the collection and recycling of related waste and that at least 65% of that waste has to be recycled. Producers and importers can choose to reach the goals on an individual basis or by joining an organization like Nedvang.

The Carbon-Based Tax on Packaging was found to be ineffective by the Ministry of Infrastructure and the Environment. It was therefore abolished. Producer responsibility activities for packaging are now financed based on legally binding contracts.

==== The Pentalateral Energy Forum ====
The Pentalateral Energy Forum is a governmental cooperation between seven European countries including the Netherlands with the aim to promote regional trading at the energy market within the European Union. In their joint political declaration released on May 11, 2020, the ministers address the potential of renewable hydrogen to play a part in the decarbonization of the energy system and achieve climate neutrality by 2050 in line with the Paris agreement.

==== The North Seas Energy Cooperation (NSEC) ====
NSEC was established in 2016 and is a collaboration between eight EU countries, in addition to Norway and the European Commission, to expand renewable energy production by the development of an offshore grid system. On 12 September 2022, the member states agreed to reach 260 GW of generated offshore wind power by 2050 which will be a major contribution to the overall EU ambition of 300 GW.

==== The Green Growth Group (GGG) ====
GGG was an informal initiative of 15 European countries that proposed a more ambitious target of reducing GHG emissions by 55% in 2030 compared to 1990 levels and replace the previous EU target of 40%. The proposal was accepted and included in the European Climate Law that came into force on July 29, 2021.

== Adaptation ==
=== Adaptation approaches ===
Numerous countries have planned or started adaptation measures. The Netherlands, along with the Philippines and Japan and United Nations Environment, launched the Global Centre of Excellence on Climate Adaptation in 2017.

As part of its commitment to environmental sustainability, the Government of the Netherlands initiated a plan to establish over 200 recharging stations for electric vehicles across the country. The rollout will be undertaken by Switzerland-based power and automation company ABB and Dutch startup Fastned, and will aim to provide at least one station within a 50-kilometre radius (30 miles) from every home in the Netherlands.

The Cultural Heritage Agency of the Netherlands executes a program on water and heritage to provide information that can be of use in spatial planning by civil services and indicates how archaeological data and historical analysis can be used for current and future water-management problems.

A governmental coalition agreement between People's Party for Freedom and Democracy (VVD), Christian Democratic Alliance (CDA), Democrats '66 (D66) and Christians Union (CU) was published on 15 December 2021. The agreement is supposed to be valid during 2021 - 2025 and address several commitments regarding adaptation to climate change in the Netherlands. The governmental efforts includes a €35-billion Climate and Transition fund to help expand necessary infrastructure for energy production and implement a new green industrial policy. Additionally, the construction of two new nuclear power plants will contribute to the energy mix and replace part of the energy loss due to the closure of Groningen gas field.

=== Policies and legislation to achieve adaptation ===
==== The National Delta Programme ====
Describes how the Dutch government, in cooperation with the rest of society, can maintain an adequate fresh water supply, ensure resilience against climate change and protect regions from flooding. The programme covers three key issues:

- Flood risk management
- Supply of fresh water
- Spatial adaptation

==== Flood risk management ====
Includes research and measures to prevent damage caused by serious floods. The category is covered by additional projects and programmes that describe various measures and aims in more detail. For example, the Dutch Flood Protection Programme (DFPP) is funding about 300 projects with the purpose to strengthen 1500 kilometers of dikes and 500 flood related facilities throughout the country by 2050. These measures are meant to be a part of the aim to achieve a protection level of 1 in 100 000 (0,001%) annual fatality rate due to flooding for residents that live behind a primary flood defense.

==== Supply of fresh water ====
In the last few years Netherlands has been exposed to increased periods of drought. Additionally, climate change is projected to increase the risk of salinization and waterlogging due to heavy rainfall which might impact the availability of fresh water. Fresh water is not only an important resource as drinking water, but also essential in many sectors such as agriculture, energy and various industries. The implementation of the Delta Plan on fresh water supply is a collaboration between the Dutch government, regional municipalities and residents to ensure a sustainable fresh water supply. Measures applied focus partly on waterlogging and efficiency in fresh water availability and distribution related to land use, which also puts it in collaboration with the Delta Plan on Spatial Adaptation. The plan consists of two phases, with separated lists of measures and implementations. Implementation of Phase 1 is meant to be completed by the end of 2023, and Phase 2 is expected to run from 2022 until the end of 2027. The total investment for implementations in phase 1 and 2 is estimated at 1.2 billion euros.

==== Spatial adaptation ====
To promote climate policy development and ensure a water-robust and climate-resilient future, Netherlands has developed a spatial adaptation plan. The plan is based on stress testing on extreme climate events such as drought, heat stress, flooding and heavy downpours to identify vulnerabilities in the living environment. These tests are conducted by the government and stakeholders every six years, or during new developments if necessary. The stress tests are followed by a risk dialogue between the affected parties to assess potential risks before the establishment of new strategies for climate adaptation. Climate adaptation strategies may contain implementation agendas that describe implementations in more detail and set out who is responsible to make them happen. This can be done in a local, regional or large-scale manner.

== Society and culture ==
=== Public opinion ===
The European Commission released a report in 2019 which found that 74% of Dutch people see climate change as a severe problem. The Social Cultural Planning Bureau (SCP) found that Climate Change was the second biggest concern from the Dutch public.

Ipsos polled Dutch people in late 2020 about climate change, commissioned by the Dutch bank ABN AMRO. Two in five Dutch people see the COVID-19 pandemic as an wake-up call for the climate. 75% of respondents want that the 'positive changes' from the COVID-19 pandemic like the reduction of CO_{2} emissions caused by a reduction of traffic and flights should stay. 50% would permanently change their travel habits for that goal. A majority of the respondents wants that COVID-19 financial relief packages should also have the goal to make the Netherlands sustainable in a faster pace.

The European Investment Bank conducted polls across the European Union in 2020–2021. The poll showed that Dutch people find it easiest to give up flying with 40% of respondents giving that answer. After flying there is meat (19%), video streaming (17%), new clothes (12%) and their car (10%). Giving up their car was the most difficult option at 40%. 9% of respondents said that are making radical lifestyle changes to combat climate change which is lower than the EU average which is 19%. 77% of people aged 15–29 years old in the EU believe their behaviors can combat climate change. 22% of respondents said that they will avoid to fly after the pandemic has ended, 30% said that they would go on vacation in the Netherlands or in nearby countries and 36% said that they would continue their previous flying habits, which is higher than the EU average (31%).

=== Protests ===
Organizations addressing climate change are polarized, with some opposing and some supporting the emissions policy of the Dutch government.

==== Environmental activism ====
Numerous protests advocating for environmental activism and solidarity have been held across the Netherlands, with the largest protest drawing 40.000 people in Amsterdam on 10 March 2019.

Extinction Rebellion has also demonstrated in the Netherlands with actions as blocking traffic on one of the busiest road in Amsterdam in front the Rijksmuseum and blocking traffic in other parts of the country as well as other actions. Extinction rebellion together with Greenpeace organized a demonstration in the airport Schiphol, 26 protesters were arrested.

===== Youth for climate =====
The first big demonstration that was organized by Youth for Climate was on 7 February 2019 in The Hague. Youth for Climate estimated that 15.000 students protested. A second strike took place on 14 March 2019 in Amsterdam. With 5.000 to 6.000 students striking. A third climate strike took place on 24 May 2019 with 1.500 students striking in Utrecht. On 20 September 2019 2.500 students protested in Maastricht. On 27 September 2019 the biggest protest took place with 35.000 people attending in The Hague.

==== Farmers' protests ====
Dutch farmers expressed their political power in farmer-led protests for agricultural reforms in the Netherlands, beginning in 2019. The Dutch farmers' protests were a key historical event that cemented the community-supported agriculture movement in the Netherlands. The farmers' protests began in 2019 in retaliation to the growing nitrogen emissions crisis. The high density of livestock in farming regions created significant nitrogen pollution, leading to mass ecological degradation. Proving particularly harmful to Dutch soil, the emissions crisis halted the progress of many agrarian sectors. The government intervened by halving livestock production nationwide to lower nitrogen levels. This decision angered many local farmers, who felt the solution was overreaching and unequivocally harming small businesses. In response, the farmers protested to safeguard the livelihoods of local farmers, support small-scale agriculture initiatives, and reduce reliance on costly, imported foods.

Farmers established national coalitions like the Farmer-Citizen Movement party, a populist party that mobilized support against government-mandated emission reforms. A primary champion for farmers' rights, this party gained traction in spring 2019 organizing local farming groups into nationwide protests. The party is commonly referred to by its Dutch name BoerBurgerBeweging (BBB), becoming the largest party in the Netherlands' Senate in 2023 with 16 seats.

Additional farmer-led groups such as the Farmers Defense Force have organized in opposition to the harmful emissions reforms affecting their land establishments. Meanwhile, environmental groups such as the Extinction Rebellion (XR) have pushed for policy changes addressing sustainability in the Netherlands.

=== Court cases ===
==== State of the Netherlands versus Urgenda Foundation ====
Urgenda Foundation v State of the Netherlands (2019) (in Dutch: Klimaatzaak Urgenda) is climate change litigation heard by the Supreme Court of the Netherlands related to government efforts to curtail carbon dioxide emissions. The case was brought against the Dutch government in 2013, arguing the government, by not meeting a minimum carbon dioxide emission-reduction goal established by scientists to avert harmful climate change, was endangering the human rights of Dutch citizens as set by national and European Union laws.

== See also ==
- Plug-in electric vehicles in the Netherlands
