= Nxchange =

Dutch stock exchange

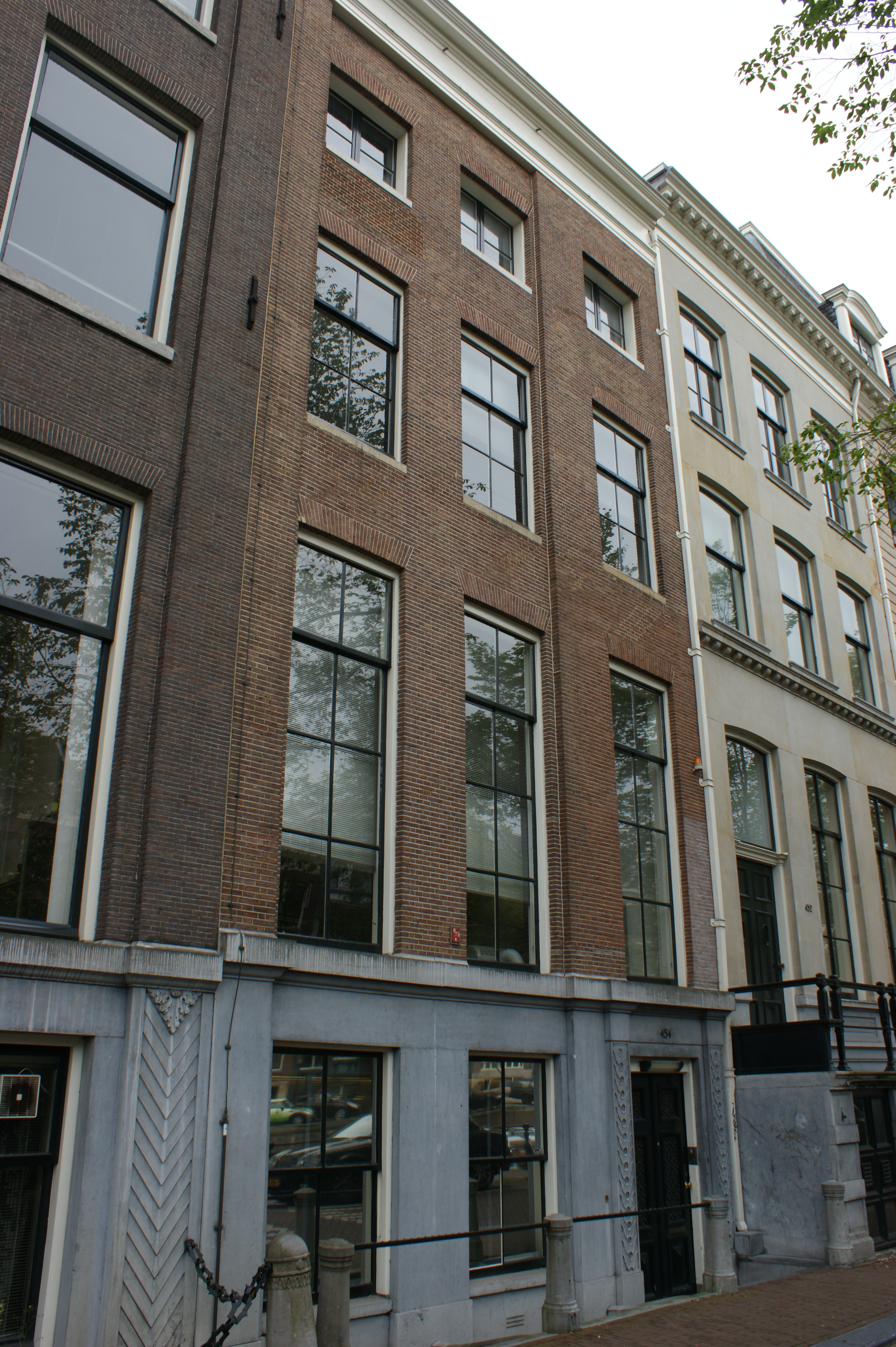
- Type: Stock exchange
- Location: Amsterdam, Netherlands
- Coordinates: 52°21′56.6″N 4°53′22.1″E
- Founded: February 20, 2015; 10 years ago
- Owner: Nxchange B.V.
- Key people: Marleen Evertsz (CEO)
- Currency: Euro (EUR)
- No. of listings: 9
- Website: www.nxchange.com

Nxchange (stylized as nx’change) is a Dutch stock exchange, that is headquartered along the Herengracht in Amsterdam. Founded in 2015, it is one of three stock exchanges operating in the Netherlands.

== Trading ==
According to CEO Marleen Evertsz, Nxchange is aimed at companies with a large following that wish to raise funds. They can list stocks, stock certificates, bonds, and funds on the exchange without a minimum issue amount. Investors are able to buy and sell stocks 24/7 without a broker and can upload reports with financial analyses on the Nxchange platform.

Transactions are settled through delivery versus payment. Clearing and settling is done by Nxchange itself, and the securities are held at the giro depot of Euroclear Nederland.

== History ==
Nxchange B.V. was founded by Marleen Evertsz in February 2015, and the stock exchange opened for trading on April 14, 2016. Charging infrastructure provider Fastned was the first company listed and managed to raise €3 million during the first month by issuing stock certificates. The stock exchange did not succeed in attracting more companies in its first year. Nxchange received a Golden Bull in 2016 in the category "best investment innovation".

The company was granted a license to operate as a multilateral trading facility in August 2018 by the Authority for the Financial Markets. It was previously classified solely as a regulated market. In December, Nxchange and Rabobank announced a cooperation called "Rabo&Crowd", allowing companies to raise money partly by borrowing from the bank and partly by issuing bonds on Nxchange. Several smaller companies have issued bonds using Rabo&Crowd in the subsequent years.

In June 2019, Fastned started a listing on the larger stock exchange Euronext, but its certificates remained tradable on Nxchange. However, it was possible to convert the stock certificates. Later that year, a number of startups selected by Startupbootcamp jointly issued share certificates on Nxchange under the name "SBC Fintech Amsterdam 1921".

== See also ==
- List of European stock exchanges
