= Symbaloo =

Web application

- Company type: Limited
- Available in: Multilingual
- Founded: 2007; 19 years ago
- Headquarters: Delft, {{{location_country}}}
- Area served: Worldwide
- Founder: Tim Has
- Website: www.symbaloo.com
- Launched: June 2007; 19 years ago
- Current status: Active

Symbaloo is a cloud-based site that allows users to organize and categorize web links in the form of buttons. Symbaloo works from a web browser and can be configured as a homepage, allowing users to create a personalized virtual desktop accessible from any device with an Internet connection.

Symbaloo users, which must be previously registered, have a page with a grid of buttons that can be configured to link to a specific page. The site allows users to assign different colors to the buttons for easy visual classification.

Symbaloo allows a single user to create different pages or screens with buttons. These screens called webmix are useful to separate topics and links can be shared with other users, making them public and sending the link via email. As of 2015 Symbaloo has 6 million users worldwide and mainly used as an online education resource. Symbaloo's slogan is "Start Simple".

== See also ==
- Start page
