= Climate change in Belgium =

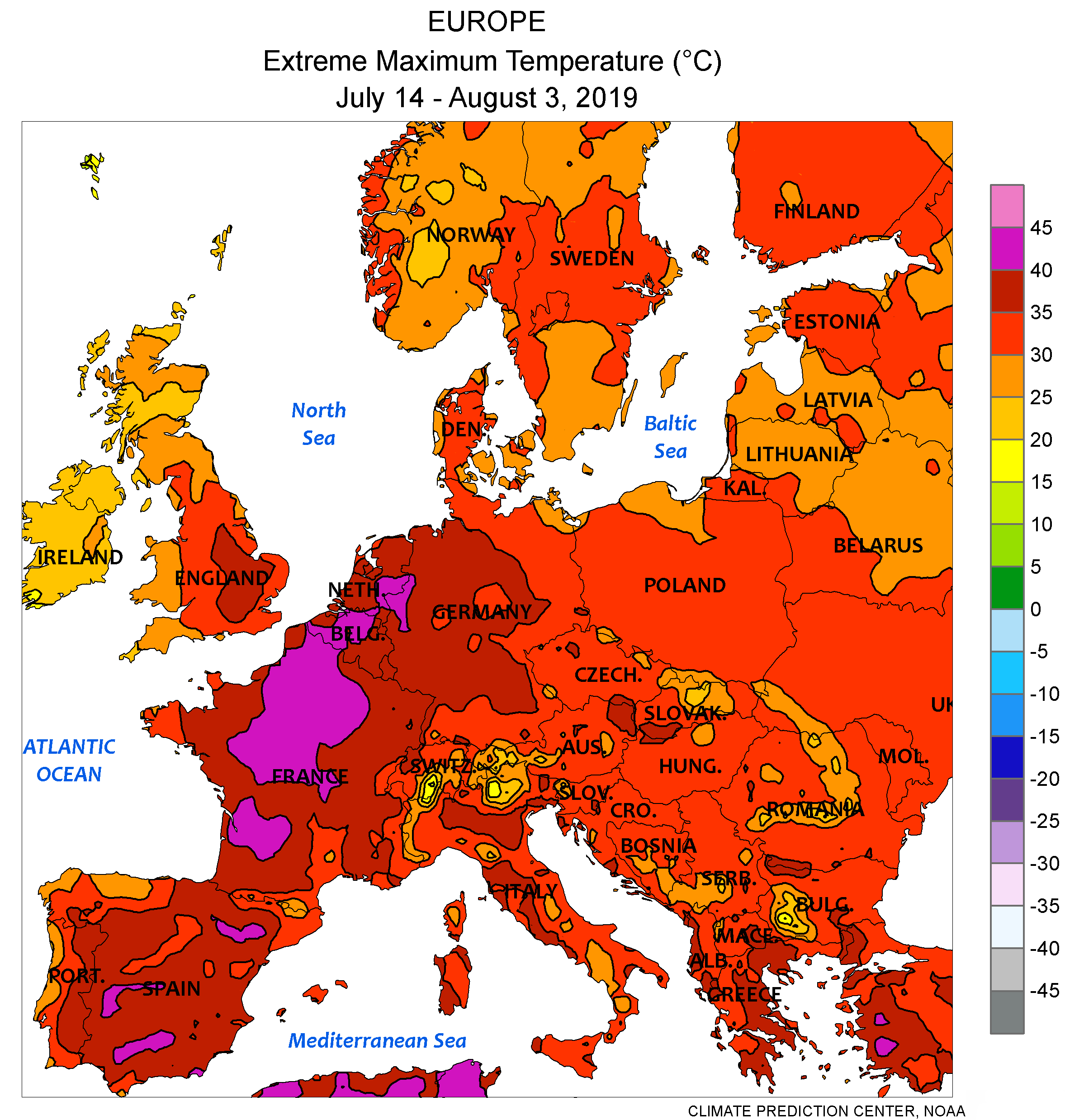
The July 2019 European heat wave affected Belgium heavily, with temperatures over 40°C.

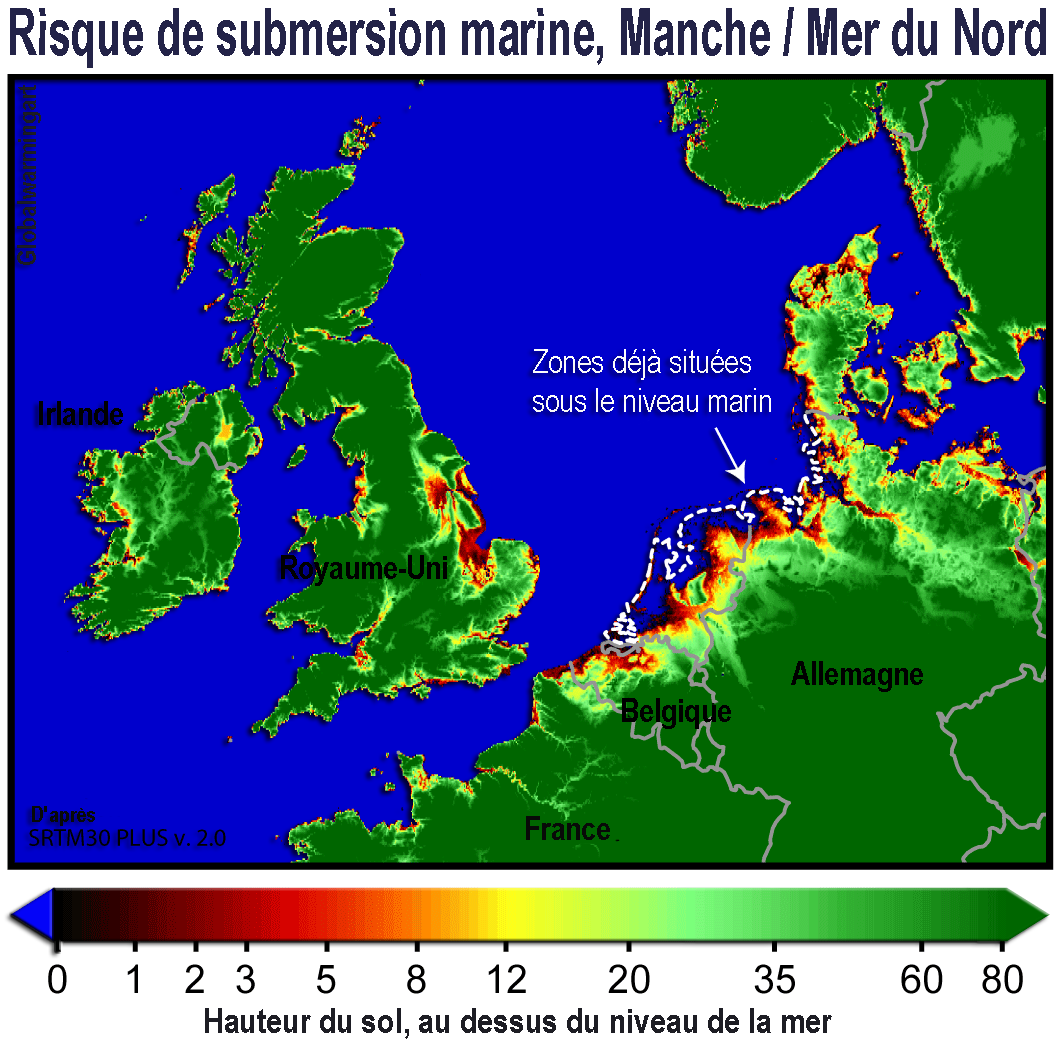
North Sea: Sea Level Risks

Belgium has the 7th largest CO_{2} emission per capita in the EU. The CO_{2} emissions have dropped 19.0% since in comparison with 1990 levels. The average temperature has risen 1.9 degrees Celsius since measurements began in 1890, with an acceleration since 1954.

Climate change in Belgium has caused temperatures rises and more frequent and intense heatwaves, increases in winter rainfall and decreases in snowfall. By 2100, sea levels along the Belgian coast are projected to rise by 60 to 90 cm with a maximum potential increase of up to 200 cm in the worst-case scenario. The costs of climate change are estimated to amount to €9.5 billion a year in 2050 (2% of Belgian GDP), mainly due to extreme heat, drought and flooding, while economics gains due to milder winters amount to approximately €3 billion a year (0.65% of GDP). The country has committed to net zero by 2050.

== Greenhouse gas emissions ==
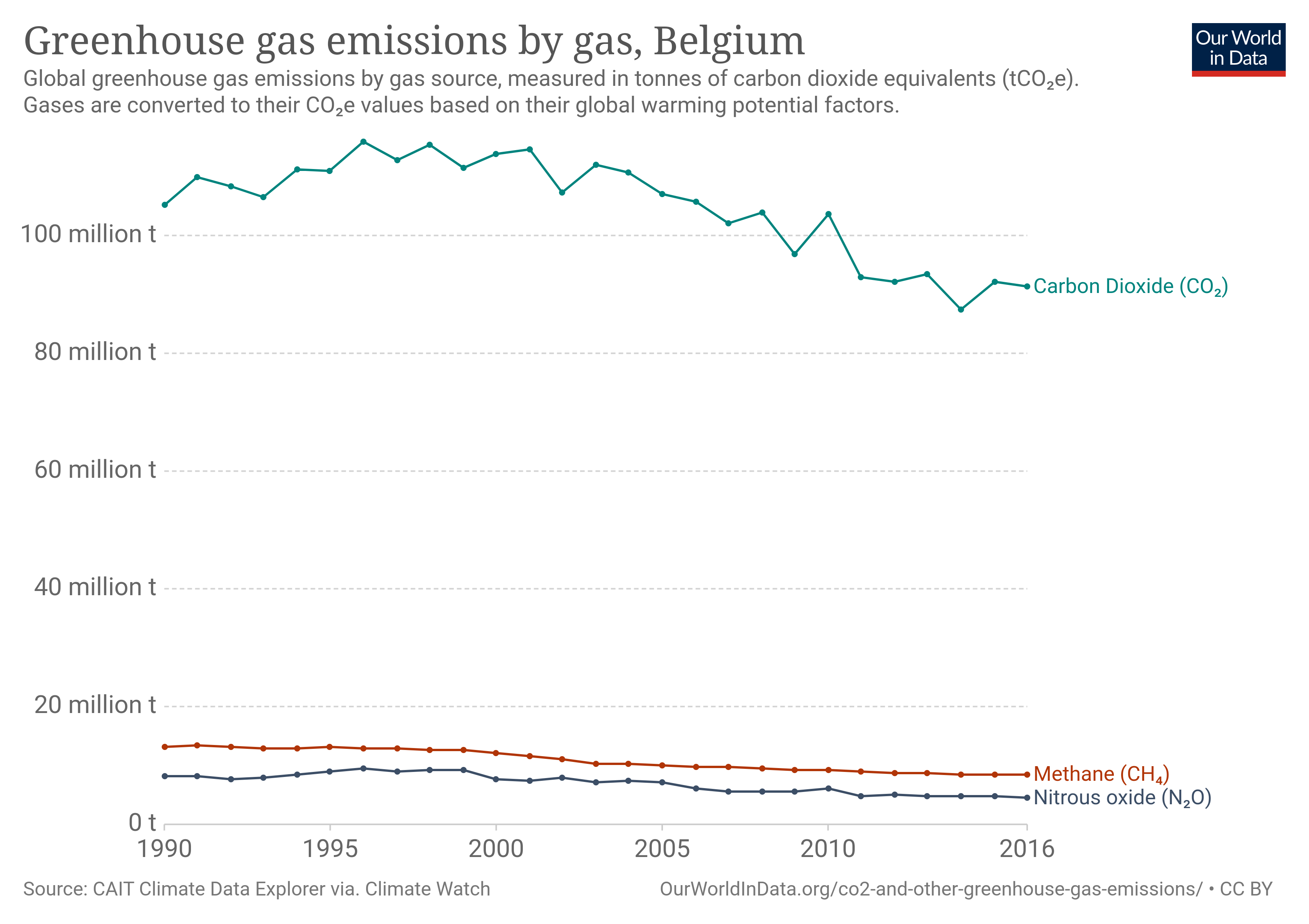
Belgium greenhouse emission of gas from 1990 to 2016

In 2023, Belgium emitted 106.82 million tonnes of greenhouse gases (around 0.2% of the global total emissions), equivalent to 9.12 tonnes per person.

In 2021, the country's greenhouse gas (GHG) emissions were 146.9 million tons of CO_{2} equivalent (Mt CO_{2} eq), whose 88 Mt came from the Flemish Region, 54.8 Mt from the Walloon Region and 4 Mt from the Brussels-capital Region.

== Mitigation and adaptation ==
Köppen climate classification map for Belgium for 1980–2016

2071–2100 map under the most intense climate change scenario. Mid-range scenarios are currently considered more likely

=== Policies and legislation ===
Being a member of the European Union, Belgium, applied the European Union Emission Trading Scheme set up by the Directive 2003/87/EC. The Kyoto Protocol sets a 7.5% reduction of greenhouse gas emission target compared to 1990. Belgium set up a National Allocation Plan at the federal level with target for each of the three regions.

On 14 November 2002, Belgium signed the Cooperation Agreement for the implementation of a National Climate Plan and reporting in the context of the UNFCCC and the Kyoto protocol. The first National Allocation Plan was for the period from 2005 to 2007. The European Commission approved it on 20 October 2004. The second allocation plan was for the period 2008-2012 and aims a reduction of 7.5% of greenhouse gas emissions compared to 1990.

==== Paris Agreement ====
The Paris Agreement is a legally binding international agreement, its main goal is to limit global warming to below 1.5 degrees Celsius, compared to pre-industrial levels. The Nationally Determined Contributions (NDC's) are the plans to fight climate change adapted for each country. Every party in the agreement has different targets based on its own historical climate records and country's circumstances and all the targets for each country are stated in their NDC.

In the case of member countries of the European Union the goals are very similar and the European Union work with a common strategy within the Paris Agreement.

=== Targets by region ===
==== Flemish Region ====
The target of the Flemish Region is a reduction of 5.2% of GHG in the period 2008-2012 compared to 1990. That means average emissions of 83.4 million tons CO_{2} equivalent in the 2008-2012 period. The 2008–2012, Flemish allocation plan deals with installation consuming more than 0.5 PJ (139 GWh) annually. 17% of GHG emissions comes from transportation and 21 from electricity production and heat production (excluded heat for buildings). There are 178 installations listed.

The largest emitters are, with their emissions in tons of CO_{2} equivalent (t CO_{2} eq) per year:

- Sidmar owned by ArcelorMittal in Ghent: 8,918,495
- Total refinery in Antwerp: 4,323,405
- BASF in Antwerp: 2,088,422
- Zandvliet Power, a joint venture of BASF and GDF Suez, in Zandvliet: 1,119,158
- Esso refinery in Antwerp: 1,933,000
- Fina Olefins in Antwerp: 1,414,550
- Electrabel in Herdersbrug: 990,397
- Electrabel in Drogenbos: 998,794
- E.ON Benelux in Vilvoorde: 828,920
- SPE in Ringvaarts: 807,066
- Electrabel in Ruien: 730,332
- E.ON Benelux in Langerloo: 586,961
- Degussa in Antwerp: 526,949

==== Brussels-Capital Region ====
Being a federal state, Brussels-Capital Region also made a second allocation plan for 2008–2012 based on the decree of June 3, 2004 that implements the European directive 2003/87/CE. In that plan, Brussels objective is to have an increase of maximum 3.475% of greenhouse gas emissions compared to 1990.

In 2004, the Brussels-Capital Region emitted 4.4 million tons CO_{2} equivalent, an increase of 9% compared to 1990 when emissions were 4.083 Mt CO_{2} eq. The emissions come from domestic use (45%), tertiary sector (25%) and transportation (19%), and energy/industry (2%). The 4.4 Mt CO_{2} eq do not take into account GHG emission due to electricity production outside the region.

The 2008–2012 allocation plans include only eight facilities:

- Audi (former Volkswagen plant) auto production plant in Forest
- a BNP Paribas facility (former Fortis)
- Bruda plant producing Asphalt
- Electrabel turbo-jet power plant in Schaerbeek
- Electrabel turbo-jet power plant at Buda
- Electrabel turbo-jet power plant owned at Volta
- an RTBF television facility
- World Trade Center building

==== Walloon Region ====
In the second allocation plan (for the period 2008–2012), the Walloon Region is planning a reduction of 7.5% of GHG emissions compared to 1990 when 54.84 million tons CO_{2} equivalent was emitted.

The plan for 2008-2012 includes 172 premises. In 2005, the largest emitters were (number in tons CO_{2} equivalent per year):

- CCB cement plant in Gaurain-Ramecroix: 1,515,543
- Holcim cement plant in Obourg: 1,508,060
- Electrabel power plant in Monceau: 1,260,520
- CBR cement plant in Lixhe: 1,059,929
- Dumont Wautier lime plant in Saint-Georges: 1,294,087

Other large emitters are cast iron and steel producers in Charleroi and Liège.

On October 22, 2009, BASF announced that they will close the plant located at Feluy at the end of 2009. That plant had a yearly allocation of 36,688 tons of CO_{2} equivalent.

==== Litigation ====
In June 2021, after a six year long legal battle, the Court of First Instance ruled that the climate targets of the government of Belgium are too low and therefore "breached the right to life (article 2) and the right to respect for private and family life (article 8)" of the European Convention on Human Rights.

== See also ==
- Plug-in electric vehicles in Belgium
