= Fastned =

Dutch electric vehicle charging company

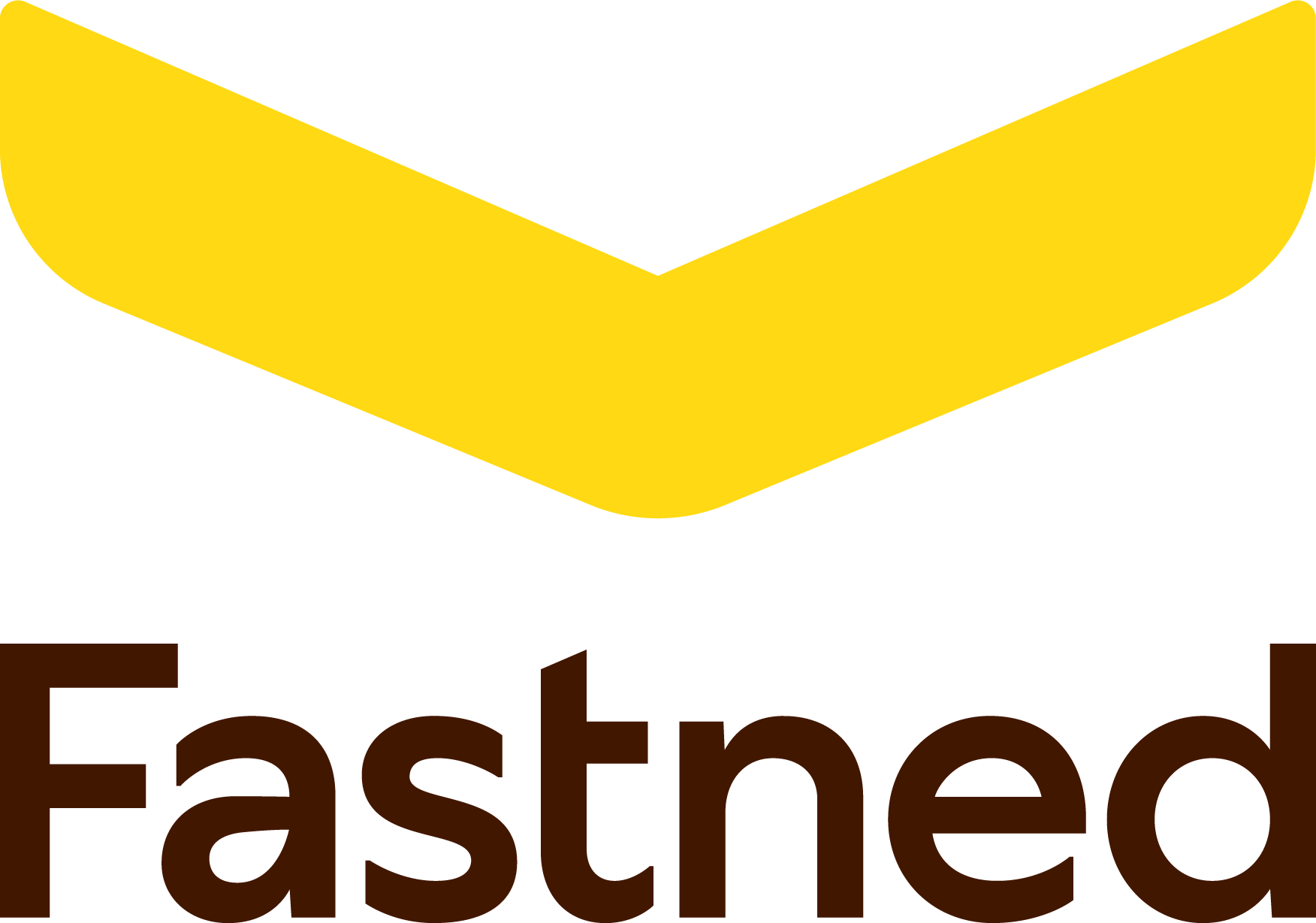
- Type: Besloten vennootschap
- Traded as: Euronext: FAST; Nxchange: FAST
- ISIN: NL0013654809; NL0010732244
- Industry: EV charging
- Founded: February 2012; 14 years ago
- Founder: Michiel Langezaal; Bart Lubbers
- Headquarters: Amsterdam, Netherlands
- Number of locations: 410 stations; 9 offices; (2026)
- Areas served: Netherlands; Germany; United Kingdom; Belgium; France; Switzerland; Denmark; Spain; Italy
- Key people: Michiel Langezaal (CEO); Victor van Dijk (CFO)
- Revenue: ▲€60.5 million (2023)
- Operating income: ▲ −€12.1 million (2023)
- Net income: ▲ −€19.25 million (2023)
- Total assets: ▲€357 million (2023)
- Total equity: ▲€146 million (2023)
- Owner: Bart Lubbers (37%); Michiel Langezaal (21.5%); Breesaap (5.9%); Schroder Capital 10.6%
- Number of employees: 222 (End of Year 2023)
- Website: fastnedcharging.com

Fastned is a Dutch company that owns and operates a growing fast charging network of over 400 stations with over 2,660 EV charging stations charge spots in the Netherlands, France, Germany, the United Kingdom, Belgium, Denmark, Italy, Spain and Switzerland. A large majority of its stations are located at Dutch highway rest areas. Fastned was founded in 2012.

The company, a besloten vennootschap, is listed on Euronext Amsterdam and Nxchange. As of 2023, 25% of the company can be traded, while the remaining shares are owned by co-founders Bart Lubbers (37%) and Michiel Langezaal (21.5%), and by investment firms Breesaap (5.9%) and Schroders Capital (10.6%). Fastned's headquarters are located in Amsterdam, and its CEO is Michiel Langezaal.

== History ==
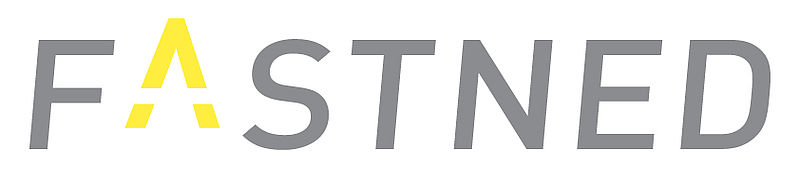
Former Fastned logo (until 2019)

=== Fundraising and first stations ===
Fastned B.V. was founded in February 2012 by Michiel Langezaal and Bart Lubbers, the son of former Prime Minister Ruud Lubbers. The company received a permit that same year to build and operate charging stations at 201 rest areas in the Netherlands for a period of fifteen years. The first four locations opened in November 2013, the first of which was located at rest area Palmpol in Terschuur, Gelderland.

Building a single charging station required about €200,000. That money came from a number of funds owned by wealthy families, one of which was the Lubbers family fund called "Breesaap", that loaned €10 million. That loan was later converted to shares. Besides, the company started issuing stock certificates on NPEX, a stock exchange aimed at SMEs, in July 2014, raising €3.2 million in one and a half years.

The fiftieth charging station near Goes was opened by former Prime Minister Jan Peter Balkenende in January 2016. Due to the low proportion of electric vehicles in the Netherlands at the time, most charging stations were used between two and four times per day according to Fastned. In April, Fastned became the first company to be listed on Nxchange when it raised €3 million in five weeks through the issue of stock certificates. The company also issued bonds with a total face value of €22 million in 2016 and 2017.

=== Further expansion ===
In 2018, the usage of Fastned's charging stations had slowly increased to an average of five to six customers daily. According to Langezaal, nearly one third of the stations were breaking even, having between 15 and 20 customers per day. The company's first foreign charging station was opened in June 2018 close to Limburg an der Lahn in Germany. Fastned also started constructing some smaller locations at Albert Heijn supermarkets and reached the mark of 100 charging stations in June 2019.

The company started being listed on Euronext Amsterdam on 21 June 2019, one week later than planned, making it possible for investors to convert their Nxchange stock certificates to Euronext certificates. The price rose from €11 to €53 on its first day, but returned to a price slightly above the initial price in the following days. Fastned had also planned an IPO that day in order to raise between €27 million and €30 million by issuing at most three million stock certificates. However, it was blown off the day before. Co-founder Bart Lubbers had left the management board one month earlier to become chairman of the supervisory board.

During the COVID-19 pandemic in 2020, Fastned experienced negative effects; its sales declined by 70% from February to March.

== Network ==
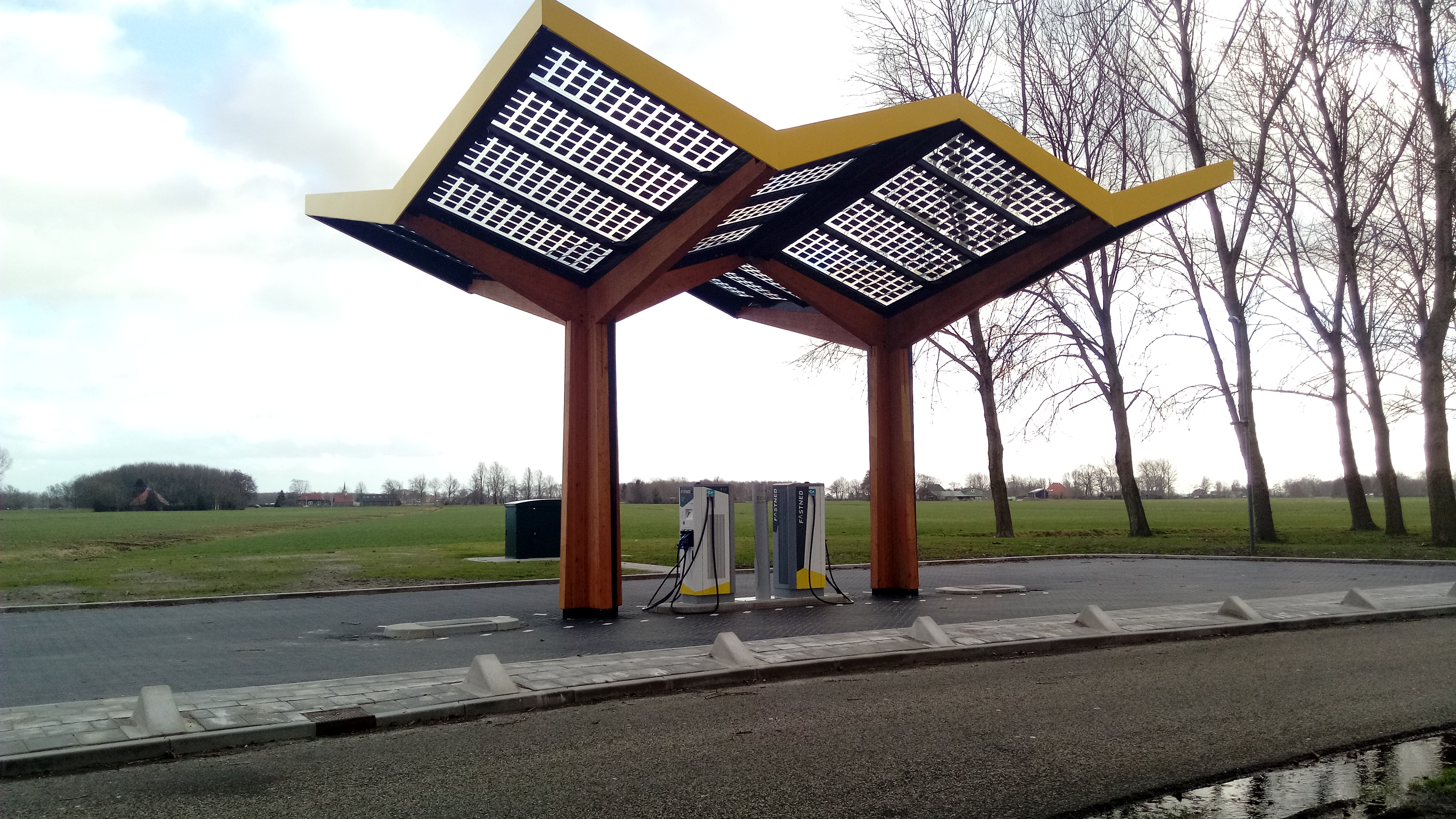
New design charging station at rest area De Wâlden along the A7 motorway

As of March 2024, Fastned's network consists of 308 EV charging stations, of which 173 are located in the Netherlands. The lion's share of Dutch charging stations are located at highway rest areas. Three are located at Albert Heijn supermarkets, and some more are situated in cities. The charging stations outside the Netherlands are in Germany (19), the United Kingdom (6), Belgium (2), and Switzerland (2). Four German locations are at hotels of Van der Valk, while the remaining are close to highways. The first British location was in Sunderland, and the company has won a tender to expand to London. In Switzerland, Fastned had won a tender to build twenty charging stations. Fastned's stations were used a total of 194,000 times during the last quarter of 2020 by 53,000 different customers. The company has plans to expand to France.

The earlier charging stations are characterized by two yellow arches with a curved roof, consisting of solar panels, in between. The company introduced a new station design in 2016 with a higher roof in order to accommodate electric trucks. Additionally, it is better suited to increases in the number of individual charging points at a station. The roof is still composed of solar panels, but they are see-through in the new design. The design is inspired by bolts of lightning.

Fastned allows roaming access to their network for third party apps and access cards. Current partners include Gireve, Q8 in Belgium, Paua in the UK and Greenflux across Europe.

Operational stations in different countries
Country	2019	2020	2021	2022	2023
Netherlands	98	105	132	151	168
Germany	15	19	31	37	39
United Kingdom	1	6	8	12	20
Belgium		2	9	18	24
Switzerland		2	2	3	7
France			6	23	38
Denmark					1

== Finances ==
Fastned's revenue had been close to zero during its initial years due to a low number of customers. In recent years, it has increased to €36 million (2022). The company has never turned a profit due to its continuing expansion.

Year	Revenue in mil. EUR	Net income in mil. EUR	Total assets in mil. EUR	Employees on average, FTE	Number of charging stations	Electricity delivered in GWh
2012	0.00	–0.3	0.2	2	0	0
2013	0.00	–0.8	3.0	14	5	0.002
2014	0.01	–2.2	7.6	19	19	0.038
2015	0.1	–4.0	16.7	24	50	0.129
2016	0.3	–5.1	18.6	21	57	0.460
2017	0.6	–5.0	33.0	24	63	1.006
2018	1.6	–6.5	40.7	40	85	2.903
2019	6.4	–12.0	57.6	47	114	7.969
2020	6.9	–12.4	80.3	54	131	11.044
2021	12.4	–24.6	214.6	76	188	20.9
2022	36	–22.2	315.2	114	244	51.9
2023	60.5	–19.2	357.5	204	297	99.6

== Lawsuits ==
Fastned has been involved in a number of lawsuits concerning permits to operate at rest areas.

=== Initial permit ===
A number of gas station operators sued the Dutch government in 2013 after Fastned had received its permit to operate charging stations at rest areas. They claimed Fastned should not have been given the permit, as existent gas stations at rest areas had been given the exclusive right to sell fuel at those places. A judge upheld Fastned's permit in July 2013 stating that the agreement between the government and the gas stations only concerns fossil fuels.

=== Amenities at charging stations ===
When Fastned wanted to add toilets and convenience stores at some of their locations, Rijkswaterstaat, the owner of the land of rest areas, did not grant the necessary permits. The government agency considered it inappropriate and unsafe to have some amenities twice at a single rest area. Fastned subsequently went to court in 2017 and won the case, as the judge found that Rijkswaterstaat provided insufficient support for its claim. Rijkswaterstaat appealed the decision, but lost again in 2019 at the Council of State, forcing the agency to grant a permit or to come up with better reasons for another denial.

=== Royal Dutch Shell ===
After Royal Dutch Shell announced in 2017 it would place charging stations at some of its locations, Fastned filed a number of lawsuits trying to prevent this in December. Some of those charging stations were to be located at rest areas already having a Fastned location. Fastned did not manage to prevent the placement through the cases, in which it raised safety concerns and argued Shell could not sell electricity with its permit to sell fuel.
