= Plug-in electric vehicles in Belgium =

As of August 2022

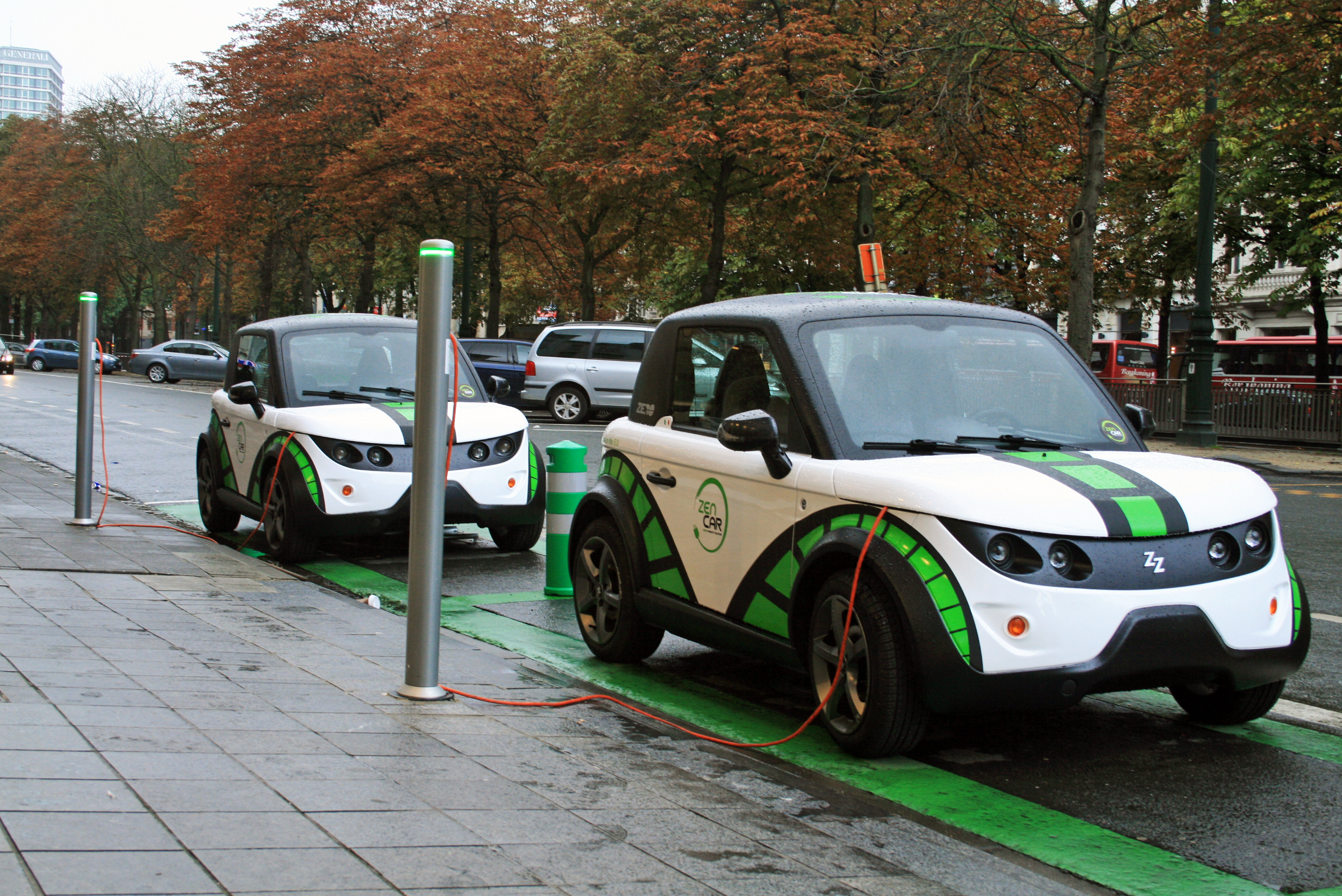

, there were around 72,000 battery electric vehicles registered in Belgium, equivalent to 1.2% of all vehicles in the country. As of 2021, 5.8% of new cars sold in Belgium were electric.

== Government policy ==
In 2021, the Belgian government announced a policy that, starting in 2026, makes all purchases of electric vehicles for company use tax-deductible.

== Public opinion ==
In a 2022 poll conducted by Deloitte, 48% of respondents said that they would buy an electric car for their next vehicle purchase.

== By region ==
=== Brussels ===
As of November 2021, there were 250 public charging stations in Brussels.

=== Flanders ===
As of 2022, there were around 15,000 public charging station ports in the Flemish Region.

=== Wallonia ===
As of 2022, there were between 1,500 and 2,000 public charging station ports in Wallonia.
