= Plug-in electric vehicles in the Netherlands =

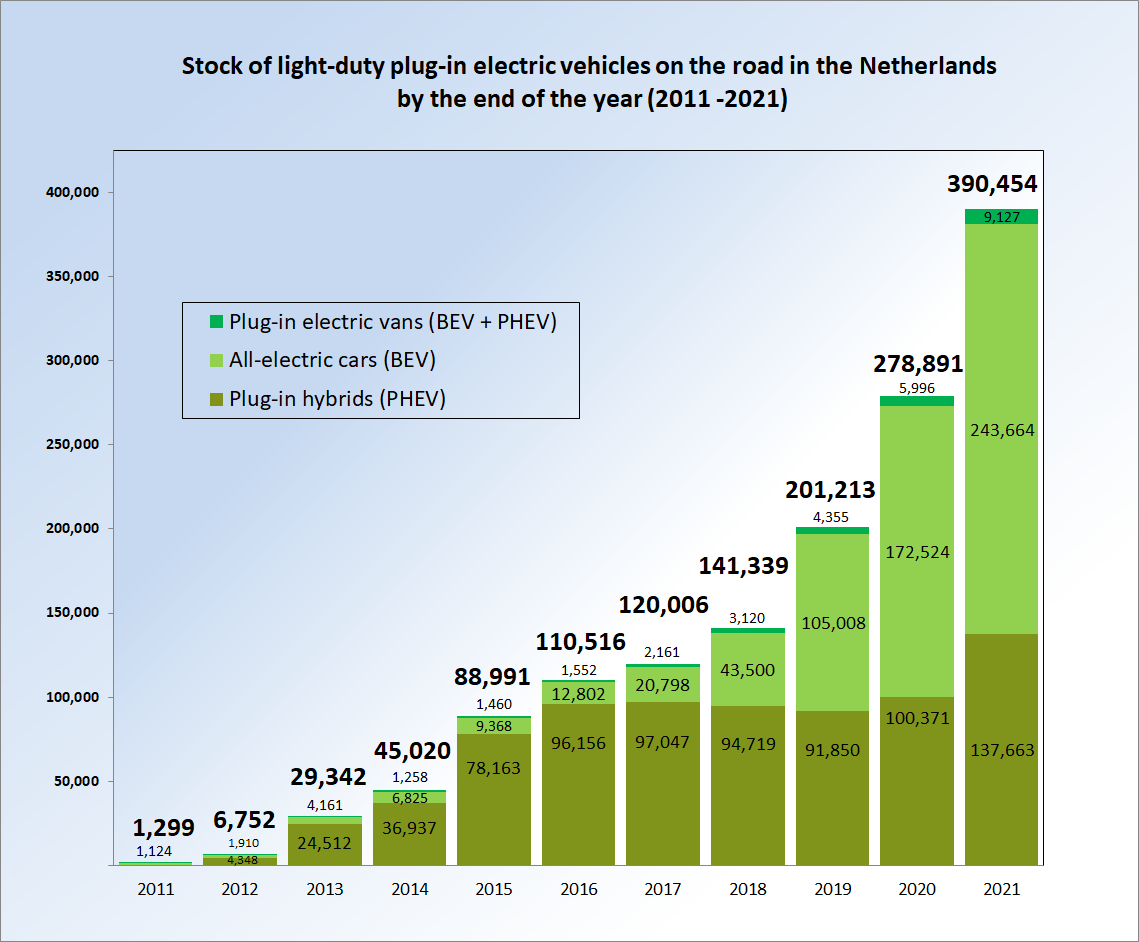
Stock of light-duty plug-in electric vehicles on the road in the Netherlands from 2011 to 2021.

The adoption of plug-in electric vehicles in the Netherlands is actively supported by the Dutch government through the exemption of the registration fee and road taxes. These purchase incentives have been adjusted over time. Considering the potential of plug-in electric vehicles in the country due to its relative small size and geography, the Dutch government set a target of 15,000 to 20,000 electric vehicles with three or more wheels on the roads in 2015; 200,000 vehicles in 2020; and 1 million vehicles in 2025. The first two targets were achieved two years earlier than planned.

The Dutch plug-in market was dominated by plug-in hybrids until 2016, when the tax rules changed after it became apparent many users rarely used the electric motors and only bought the cars for their tax advantage. In 2019, plug-in electric passenger cars had a market share of 14.9%, and rose to 24.6% in 2020, with battery electric vehicles dominating sales in both years. As of 31 December 2021, there were 390,454 highway-legal light-duty plug-in electric vehicles in use in the Netherlands, consisting of 137,663 fully electric cars, 243,664 plug-in hybrid cars, and 9,127 light duty plug-in commercial vehicles. The fleet in circulation of plug-in electric passenger cars represented 4.3% of all passenger cars in Dutch roads at the end of 2021, up from 3.1% in 2020.

As of December 2012, the Netherlands was the country with the highest ratio of slow charging points to electric vehicles (EVSE/EV), with a ratio of more than 0.50, while the U.S had a slow EVSE/EV ratio of 0.20. The Netherlands' mix of slow and fast chargers has allowed it to become the country with the highest number of charging point per capita in the world. As of 31 December 2016, there were 11,768 public slow charging points available 24/7, 14,320 slow charging point with limited public access, 612 public and semi-public fast charging points, and over 72,000 private charging points.

== Government incentives ==
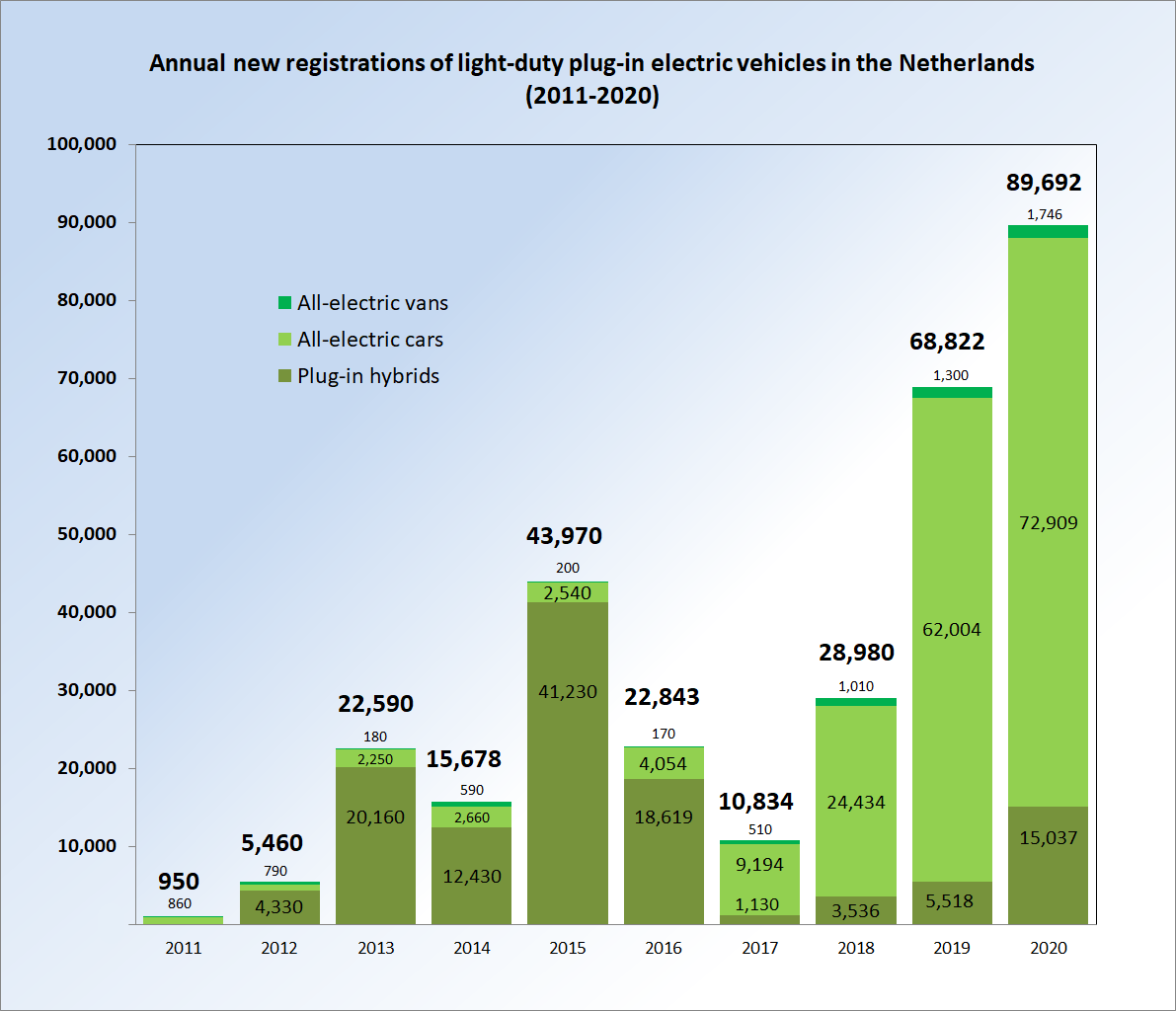
Annual sales of light-duty plug-in electric vehicles in the Netherlands by year between 2011 and 2020. The strong fluctuation in annual registrations is the result of frequent changes in purchase and tax incentives.

Considering the potential of plug-in electric vehicles in the country due to its relative small size and geography, the Dutch government set a target of 15,000 to 20,000 electric vehicles with three or more wheels on the roads in 2015; 200,000 vehicles in 2020; and 1 million vehicles in 2025. The first government target was achieved in 2013, two years earlier, thanks to the sales peak that occurred at the end of 2013. According to official figures, 30,086 plug-in electric vehicles with three or more wheels have been registered in the country through 31 December 2013.

Initially, the Dutch government set incentives such as the total exemption of the registration fee and road taxes, which resulted in savings of approximately €5,324 for private car owners over four years, and €19,000 for corporate owners over five years. Other vehicles including hybrid electric vehicles were also exempt from these taxes if they emit less than 95 g/km for diesel-powered vehicles, or less than 110 g/km for gasoline-powered vehicles. The exemption from the registration tax ended on January 1, 2014, and thereafter, all-electric vehicles pay a 4% registration fee and plug-in hybrids a 7% fee.

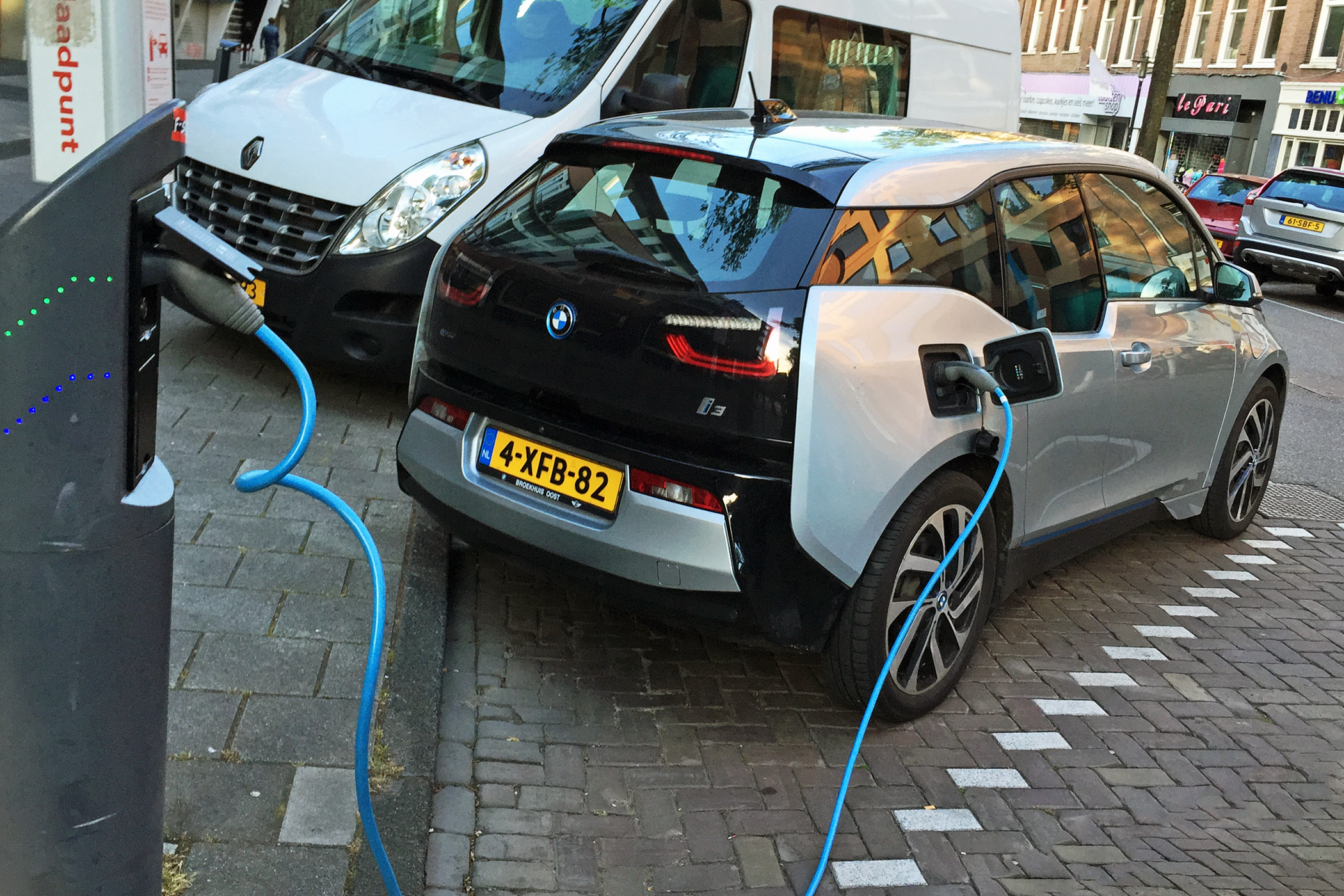
BMW i3 charging in Amsterdam.

In addition, the national government offers through the Ministry of Infrastructure and the Environment a €3,000 subsidy on the purchase of all-electric taxis or delivery vans. This subsidy increases to €5,000 per vehicle in Amsterdam, Rotterdam, The Hague, Utrecht, and Arnhem-Nijmegen metropolitan area. An additional subsidy is offered by several local government for the purchase of full electric taxis and vans, €5,000 in Amsterdam and €3,000 in Limburg and Tilburg.

In Amsterdam EV owners also have access to parking spaces reserved for battery electric vehicles, so they avoid the current wait for a parking place in Amsterdam, which can reach up to 10 years in some parts of the city. Free charging is also offered in public parking spaces. EV owners in the city of Rotterdam are entitled to one year of free parking in downtown and enjoy subsidies of up to €1,450 if they install a home charger using green electricity. The city also introduced in 2014 a scrappage program to remove old polluting vehicles to improve air quality in the city. Rotterdam offers a €2,500 incentive for business buyers to replace the old vehicles with all-electric vehicles. The subsidy is only available to the first 5,000 applicants that buy an eligible vehicle before the end of December 2013.

Other factors contributing to the rapid adoption of plug-in electric vehicles are the relative small size of the country, which reduces range anxiety (the Netherlands stretches about 100 mi (160 km) east to west); a long tradition of environmental activism; high gasoline prices (Europe per litre compared to 40.4 eurocents per kWh as of October 2023), which make the cost of running a car on electricity substantially cheaper; and also some EV leasing programs provide free or discounted gasoline-powered vehicles for those who want to take a vacation driving long distances. With all of these incentives and tax breaks, plug-in electric cars have similar driving costs than conventional cars.

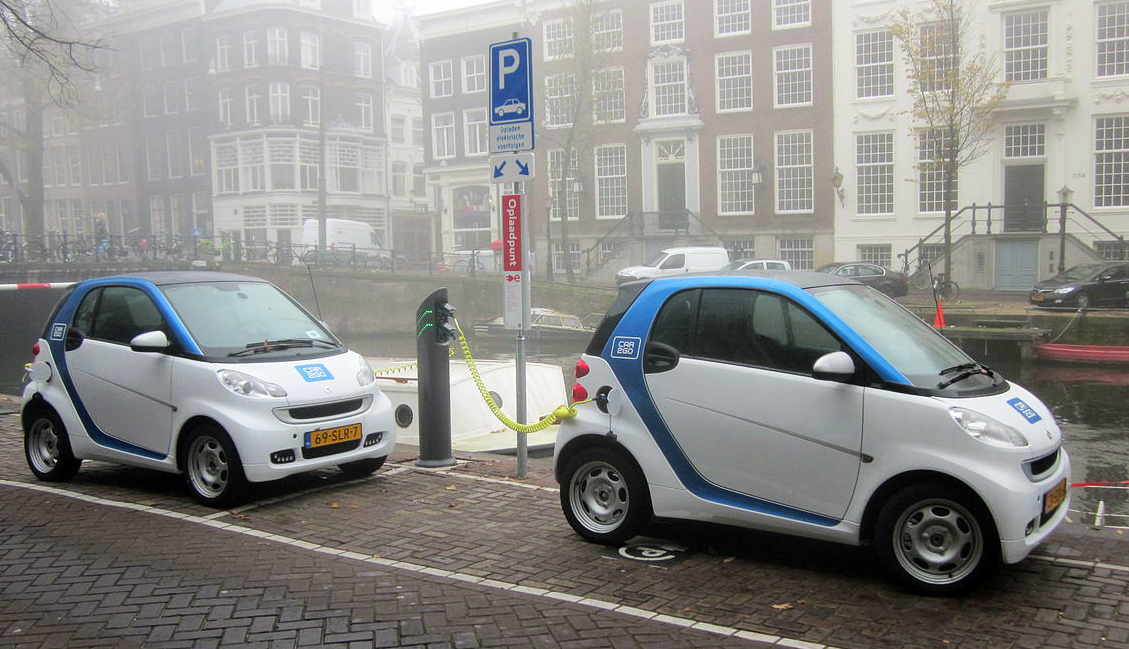
Two Car2Go Smart electric drives charging at the Herengracht in Amsterdam.

Initially, sales of plug-in electric car were lower than expected, and during 2012 the segment captured a market share of less than 1% of new car sales in the country. As a result of the end of the total exemption of the registration fee, the segment sales peaked at the end of 2013, and plug-in electric car sales reached a market share of 5.34% of new car sales in 2013. The total cost of the tax exemptions for the Dutch treasury of the more than 22,000 plug-in electric vehicles sold in 2013 was estimated at €500 million (US$691 million).

EV car sharing

On November 24, 2011, Amsterdam became the fifth city in the world with a Car2Go carsharing service, and the first in Europe with an all-electric fleet. A fleet of 300 Smart electric drives is available on-demand. As of September 2012, these Car2Go vehicles and other electric cars in Amsterdam had access to more than 320 charging stations in the city area. The number is expected to increase significantly up to 1,000 by end of 2012.

== Charging infrastructure ==
As of December 2012, the Netherlands was the country with the highest ratio of slow charging points to electric vehicles (EVSE/EV), with a ratio of more than 0.50, while the U.S had a slow EVSE/EV ratio of 0.20. The Netherlands' mix of slow and fast chargers has allowed it to become the country with the highest number of charging point per capita in the world. There were 80 CHAdeMO quick charging stations across the country by April 2014.

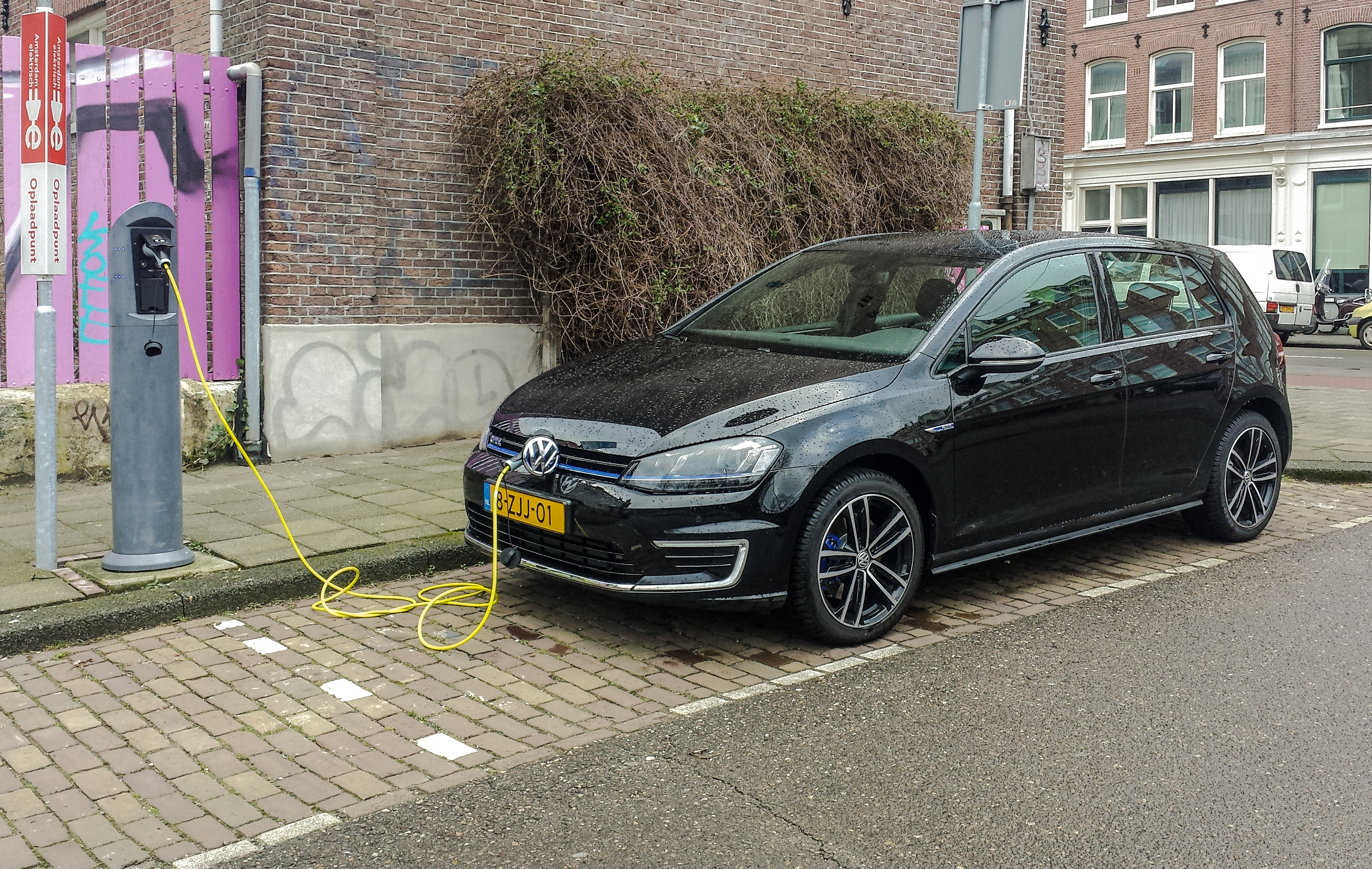
Volkswagen Golf GTE charging in Utrecht

The number of charging stations increased from 400 units in 2010 to 1,841 in 2011. As of December 2013, there were 3,521 slow charging points available 24/7 to the public, up from 2,782 in December 2012; 2,249 slow charging point with limited public access, up from 829 in December 2012; and 106 public and semi-public fast charging points, up from 63 in December 2012. As of 31 December 2016, the country's charging infrastructure consisted of 11,768 public slow charging points available 24/7 up from 7,395 in December 2015; 14,320 slow charging point with limited public access, up from 10,391 in December 2015; 612 public and semi-public fast charging points; and over 72,000 private charging points, up from 55,000 in 2015.

As part of its commitment to environmental sustainability, the Dutch government initiated a plan to establish over 200 recharging stations for electric vehicles across the country by 2015. The rollout will be undertaken by Switzerland-based power and automation company ABB and Dutch startup Fastned, and will aim to provide at least one station every 50 km (31 mi) for the country's 17 million residents.

As of September 2023, there were 147,340 publicly accessible charging points in the Netherlands, 5,043 of which were categorized as fast (>22kW).

The average price per kWh at a public AC charging point in the Netherlands as of September 2023 was 40.4 eurocents. Large price differences exist within small neighborhoods for equivalent public charging points in the Netherlands for a myriad of reasons, such as overlapping public charging concessions granted to different private companies.

== Sales ==
Stock of light-duty plug-in electric vehicles in use in the Netherlands compared to the world's top-selling countries and regional markets as of December 2021.

As of 31 December 2020, there were 297,380 highway-legal light-duty plug-in electric vehicles registered in the Netherlands, consisting of 182,481 pure electric cars, 108,652 plug-in hybrids, and 6,247 all-electric light utility vans. When other vehicle classes (buses, heavy-duty truck, mopeds, etc) are accounted for, the Dutch plug-in fleet on the road climbs to 382,721 units. A distinct feature of the Dutch plug-in market until 2016 was the dominance of plug-in hybrids, which represented 80.8% of the country's stock of passenger plug-in electric cars and vans registered at the end of December 2017. The shift to focus incentives on battery electric vehicles was due to a change in the tax rules in 2016 after it became apparent many users rarely charged their plug-in hybrids and only bought the cars for their tax advantage.

The number of registered electric cars increased from 68 in 2009, through 395 in 2010 to 1,182 in 2011. Registrations reached 6,258 plug-in electric-drive passenger vehicles through December 2012, of which, 4,348 were range extending or plug-in hybrids. Registrations in 2013 rose to 29,342 plug-in passenger cars, of which, 24,512 were plug-in hybrids. The registered light-duty fleet climbed to 45,020 units in December 2014, consisting of 36,937 plug-in hybrids, 6,825 all-electric cars and 1,258 all-electric utility vans. With 43,971 plug-in passenger cars and utility vans registered in 2015, the Netherlands ranked as the world's third best-selling country market for light-duty plug-in vehicles that year.

Until December 2015, the Netherlands had the world's fourth largest light-duty plug-in vehicle stock after the U.S., China and Japan, and also had the largest fleet light-duty plug-in vehicles in Europe. Sales in the Dutch plug-in market fell sharply during 2016 after changes in the tax rules that went into force at the beginning of 2016. Sales during the first half of 2016 were down 64% from the same period in 2015. By early October 2016, the Netherlands listed as the third largest European plug-in market, after being surpassed by both Norway and France, and in the global ranking fell from fourth to sixth place. The stock of light-duty plug-in electric vehicles registered in the Netherlands achieved the 100,000 unit milestone in November 2016.

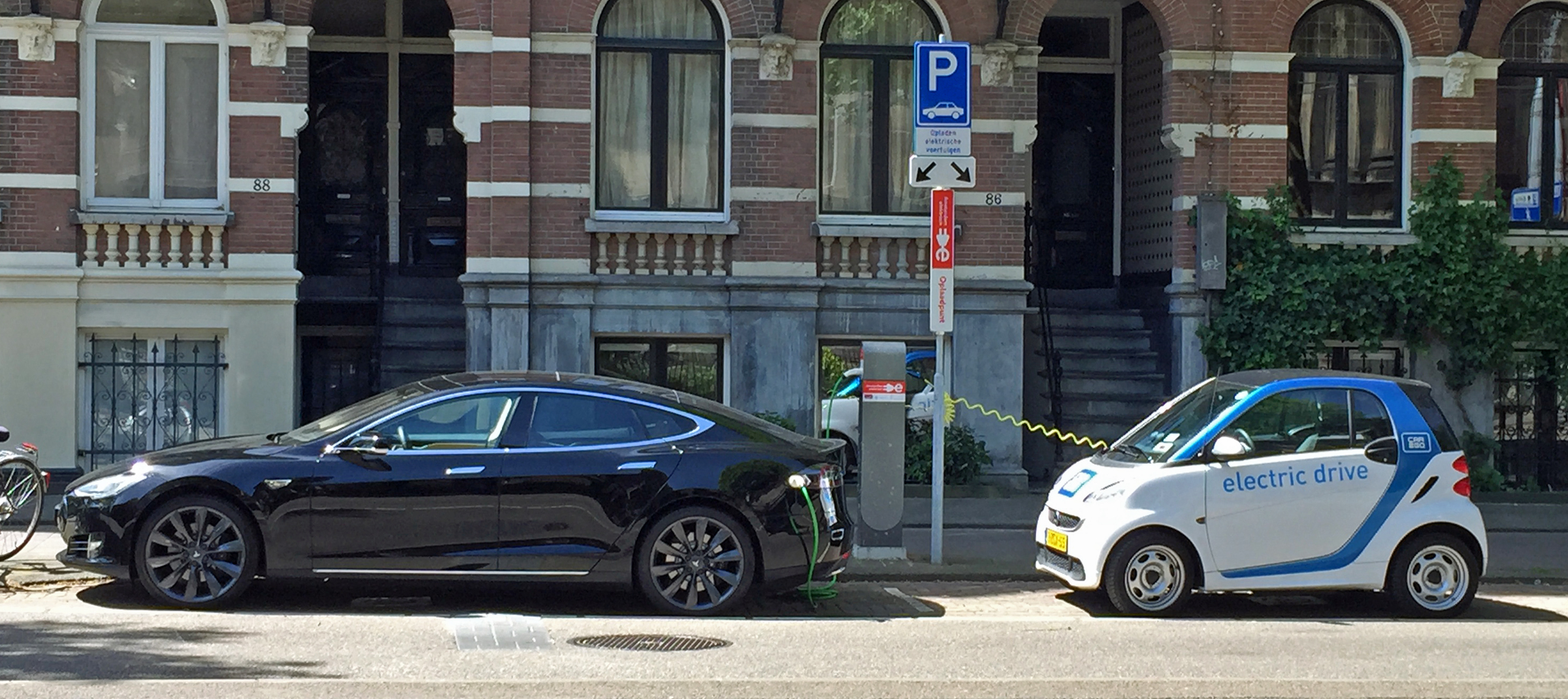
Two electric cars charging on street in Amsterdam: Tesla Model S (left) and Smart ED (right).

In 2013, the Netherlands reached a market concentration of 1.71 registered plug-in vehicles per 1,000 people, second only to Norway (4 per 1,000 people), and over three times higher than the world's two largest plug-in electric vehicle markets at the time, the United States and Japan. As of July 2016, the market concentration had increased to 5.6 registered plug-in cars per 1,000 people, almost as high as California's (5.8), the leading American market, but still exceeding the U.S. by 3.7 times. According to research report published by Navigant Research in April 2014, the fleet of light duty plug-in electric vehicles in use in the Metropolitan Region Amsterdam in 2013 is expected to represent 7.7% of the city's total registered light-duty vehicle stock.

Registrations of plug-in electric car represented a 0.57% share of total new car registrations in the country during 2011 and 2012, ahead of other European countries with a larger car market, such as Germany, France, and the U.K. During 2013 plug-in electric passenger car registrations totaled 22,415 units, climbing 338% from 2012, the highest rate of growth of any country in the world in 2013. The segment's market share surged almost ten times from 2012 to 5.34% new car sales in the country during that year, the world's second highest in 2013 after Norway (5.6%).

The market share of the plug-in electric passenger car segment in 2014 fell to 3.86% of total new passenger car registrations, after the end of some of the tax incentives. With 43,769 plug-in passenger cars registered in 2015, the segment market share rose to a record 9.74% of new car sales in the Dutch market in 2015, the second highest after Norway (22.4%). The Netherlands had the world's largest share of plug-in hybrids among its plug-in electric passenger car stock, with 83,686 plug-in hybrids registered at the end of August 2016, out of 95,088 plug-in electric cars, representing an 88.0% share of the Dutch plug-in car stock.

=== 2012 ===
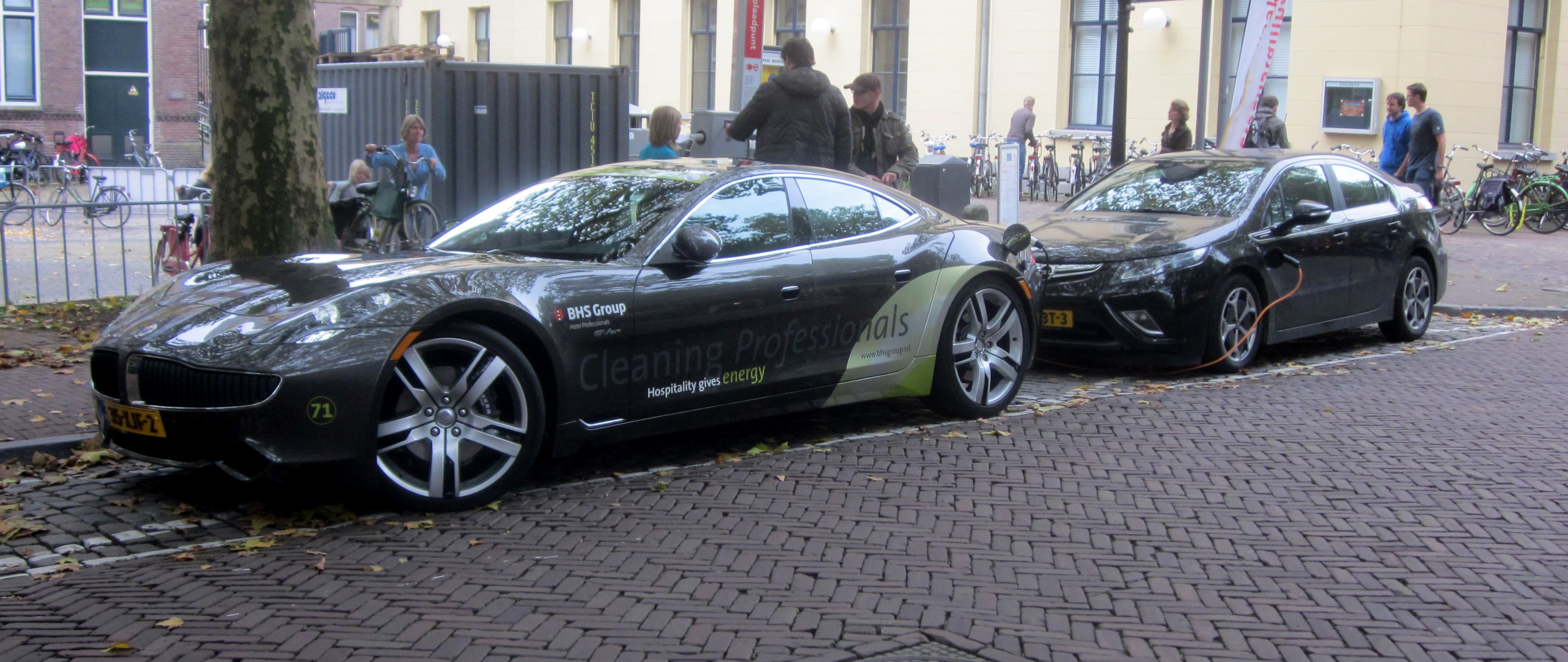
A Fisker Karma (left) and an Opel Ampera (right) charging in Utrecht.

The Opel Ampera extended-range electric car became the best selling plug-in electric car in the Netherlands by May 2012, with a market share of more than 50%, and represented 77% of passenger EV sales in the country that month. The Netherlands was the top selling European market for the Ampera in 2012, with cumulative sales of 3,017 cars of the Volt/Ampera family through December 2012, consisting of 2,704 Amperas and 313 Volts. During 2012 the Netherlands also led European sales of the Toyota Prius Plug-in Hybrid (1,184 units) and the Fisker Karma (140 units).

A total of 5,093 plug-in electric cars were registered in the Netherlands during 2012. Sales of range extending and plug-in hybrids in the Netherlands represented 8% of global sales of PHEVs in 2012. Sales of plug-in hybrid cars took the lead over all-electric cars during 2012. The Opel Ampera was the best selling plug-in electric car in 2012 with 2,696 units sold, and the Prius Plug-in Hybrid ranked second, with 1,184 units, followed by the Chevrolet Volt with 306 units sold during the year. Adding 140 Fisker Karmas sold during 2012, the plug-in hybrid segment led the Dutch EV market with 4,326 units sold during 2012, representing 84.9% of all plug-in electric car sales in the country that year. The Nissan Leaf was the top selling all-electric car in the country in 2012 with 265 units sold, and a total of 559 units since their introduction in the country by mid-2011. As of December 2012, the Mitsubishi i-MiEV family had sold 468 units since their release in 2010, including 252 iOns, 137 C-Zeros, and 79 i MiEVs.

=== 2013 ===
Plug-in car sales totaled 1,120 units in August 2013, marking the first time more than 1,000 plug-in electric cars were sold in the country in one month. During the first eight months of 2013, about 80% of plug-in car sales were made by corporate customers. This record was surpassed in September 2013, with 1,315 plug-in electric cars sold, led by the Volvo V60 plug-in with 755 units, followed by the Tesla Model S and the Opel Ampera, both with 170 units.

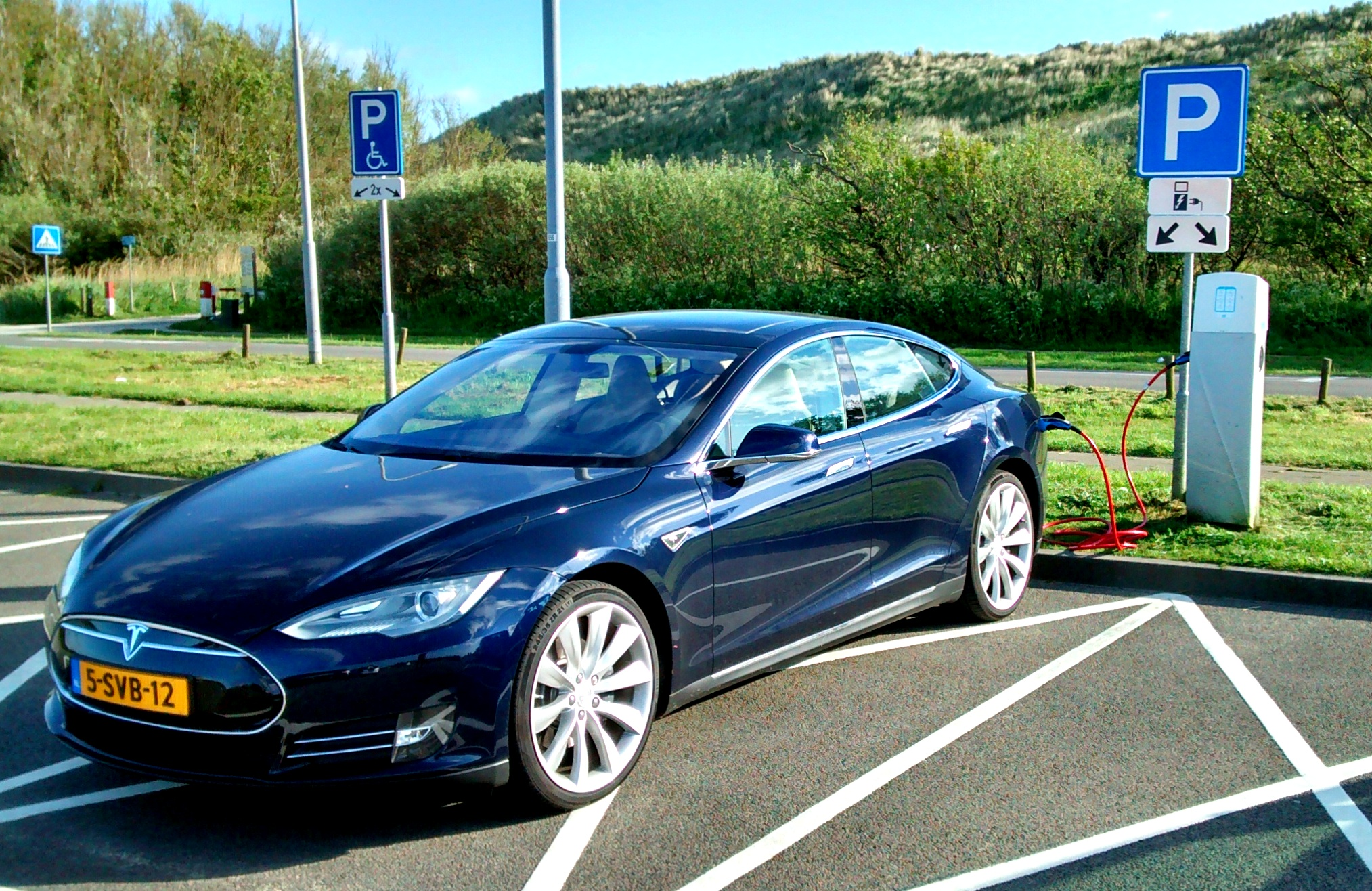
The Tesla Model S, released in the Dutch market in September 2013, is the country's top selling all-electric car ever, with 5,681 units registered at the end of October 2016.

The monthly record for plug-in car sales was surpassed one more time in November 2013, with 5,225 plug-in electric cars sold. Plug-in electric car sales also captured a record market share of 12.8% of monthly new car sales. In addition, another record was set in November 2013, when for the first time in the Netherlands a plug-in electric vehicle was listed as the top selling new car that month. That record was set by the Mitsubishi Outlander P-HEV with 2,736 units sold, which represented a market share of 6.8% of all the new cars sold that month.

Again in December 2013, the Outlander P-HEV ranked as the top selling new car in the country with 4,976 units delivered, representing a 12.6% market share of new car sales that month. December sales reached a record of about 9,300 plug-in electric vehicles delivered, representing a world record market share of 23.8% of new car sales in the country. These record sales allowed the Netherlands to become the second country, after Norway, where plug-in electric cars have topped the monthly ranking of new car sales. The strong increase of plug-in car sales during the last months of 2013 was due to the end of the total exemption of the registration fee for corporate cars, which is valid for 5 years. From January 1, 2014, all-electric vehicles pay a 4% registration fee and plug-in hybrids a 7% fee. The Outlander P-HEV ended 2013 as the best-selling plug-in electric car with 8,039 units sold, followed by the Volvo V60 PHEV with 6,144 units. As of December 2013, out of 28,673 plug-in passenger cars registered in the Netherlands, plug-in hybrids represent 85.5% of total plug-in electric car registrations through 2013.

=== 2014 ===
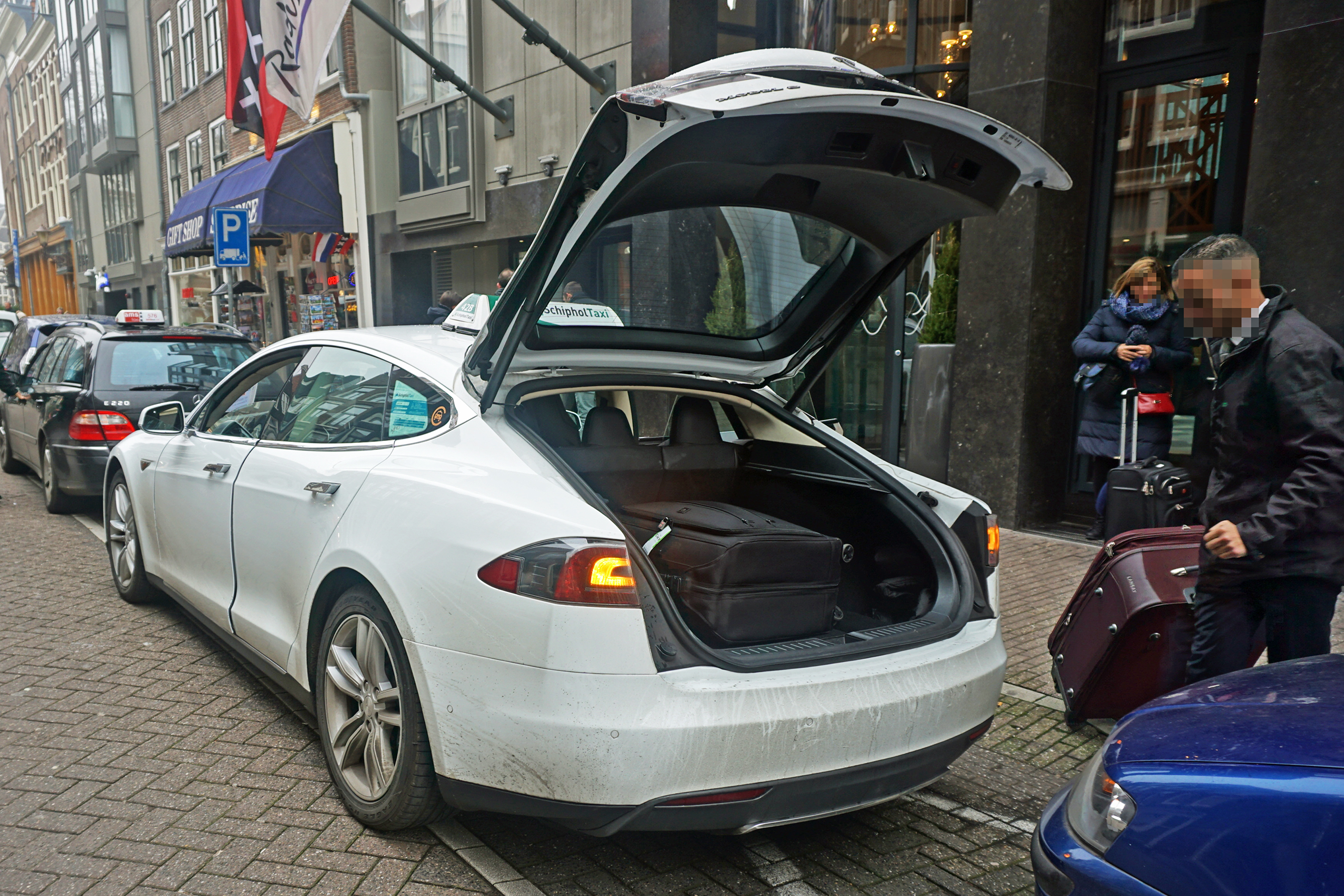
Since 2014 all-electric taxi service is available at Amsterdam Airport Schiphol provided with Tesla Model S cars.

After the end of the registration fee exemption, sales fell to 404 units in January 2014, with the Volvo V60 PHEV leading monthly sales with 272 units, followed by the Outlander P-HEV with 82 units. Sales of all-electric cars were led by the BMW i3, with 15 units delivered. Only 7 units of the Model S were sold in January. In April 2014 the Schiphol Group announced that three companies were selected to provide all-electric taxi service in Amsterdam Airport Schiphol. The concessions started on June 1, 2014 and service is provided with 100 Tesla Model S cars, which jointed service to the electric buses and hybrid cars already operating at the airport. Dutch sales of the Mitsubishi Outlander P-HEV reached the 10,000 unit milestone in April 2014. The Outlander continued as the top selling plug-in electric car in the country during the rest of 2014.

A total of 15,678 light-duty plug-in electric vehicles were registered in the Netherlands in 2014, consisting of 12,425 plug-in hybrids, down 38.4% from 2013, 2,664 all-electric cars, up 18.3% from a year earlier, and 589 vans, up 236.6% from 2013. Sales in 2014 were led by the Outlander P-HEV with 7,712 units, followed by Volvo V60 Plug-in Hybrid with 3,126 units, and the Tesla Model S with 1,533 units. A total of 45,020 light-duty plug-in electric vehicles were registered in the Netherlands at the end of December 2014, consisting of 36,937 plug-in hybrids, 6,825 all-electric cars, and 1,258 all-electric utility vans.

=== 2015 ===
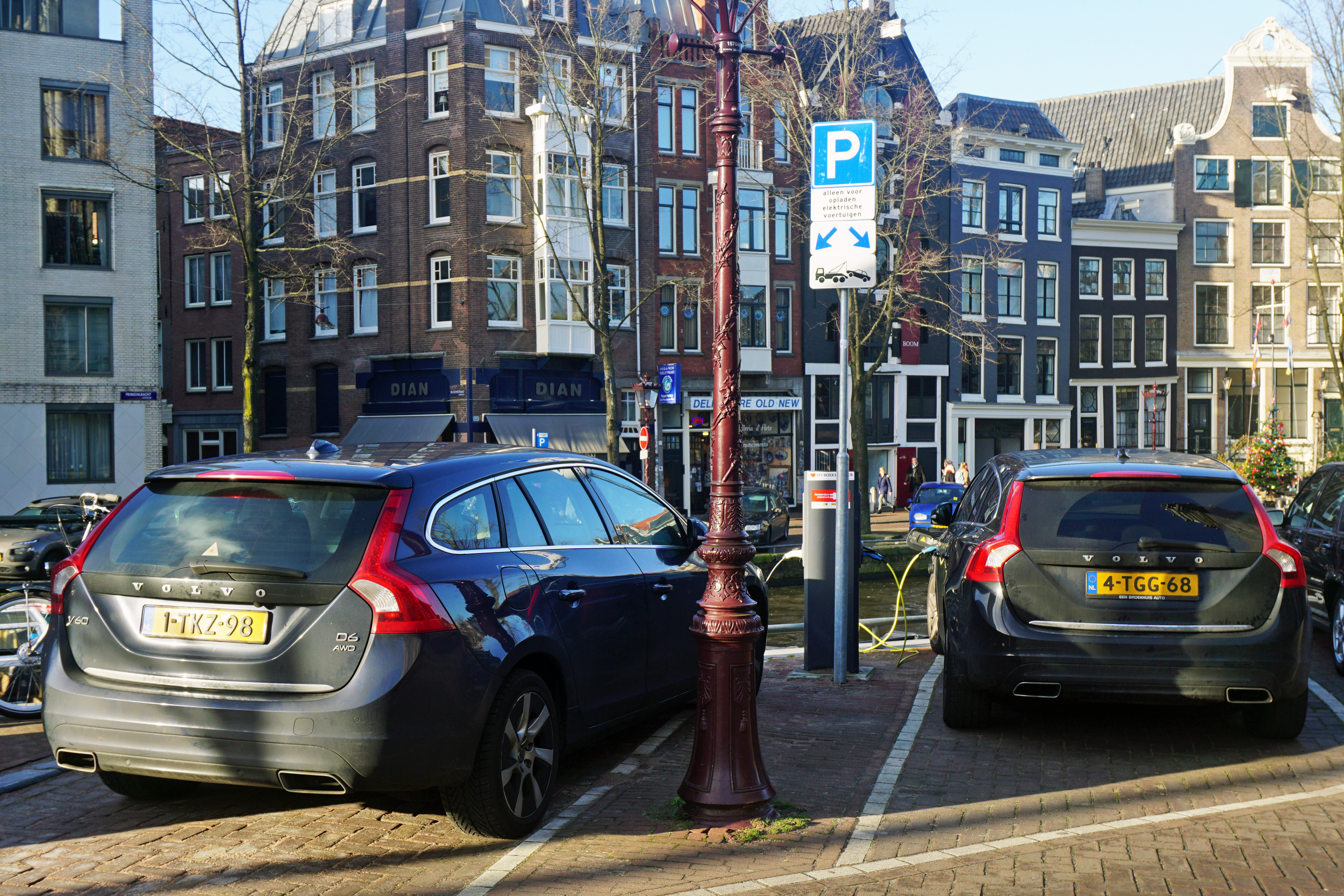
The Volvo V60 PHEV is the all-time second best selling plug-in electric vehicle in the Netherlands, with 15,804 units registered at the end of December 2016. Shown charging in Amsterdam.

The top 5 best-selling plug-in electric cars in 2015 were all plug-in hybrids, led by the Mitsubishi Outlander P-HEV (8,757), followed by the Volkswagen Golf GTE (8,183), Audi A3 e-tron (4,354), Volvo V60 Plug-in Hybrid (3,851), and Volkswagen Passat GTE (2,879). The top selling all-electric car was the Tesla Model S (1,842). Plug-in car sales achieved its best monthly volume on record ever in December 2015, with about 15,900 units sold, and allowing the segment to reach a record market share of about 23%. The surge in plug-in car sales was due to reduction of the registration fees for plug-in hybrids. From January 1, 2016, all-electric vehicles continue to pay a 4% registration fee, but for a plug-in hybrid the fee rises from 7% to 15% if its CO_{2} emissions do not exceed 50 g/km. The rate for a conventional internal combustion car is 25% of its book value.

As of December 2015, the Mitsubishi Outlander P-HEV continues as the all-time top-selling plug-in car in the country with 24,506 registered. Ranking second is the Volvo V60 Plug-in Hybrid (14,470), followed by the Volkswagen Golf GTE (8,806), Opel Ampera (4,947 units), Tesla Model S (4,832), and Audi A3 e-tron (4,657). A total of 78,163 plug-in hybrids out of 87,531 passenger plug-in electric vehicles were registered in the Netherlands as of 31 December 2015, meaning that plug-in hybrids dominate the Dutch market with a share of 89.3% of the country's highway legal plug-in electric car stock.

=== 2016 ===
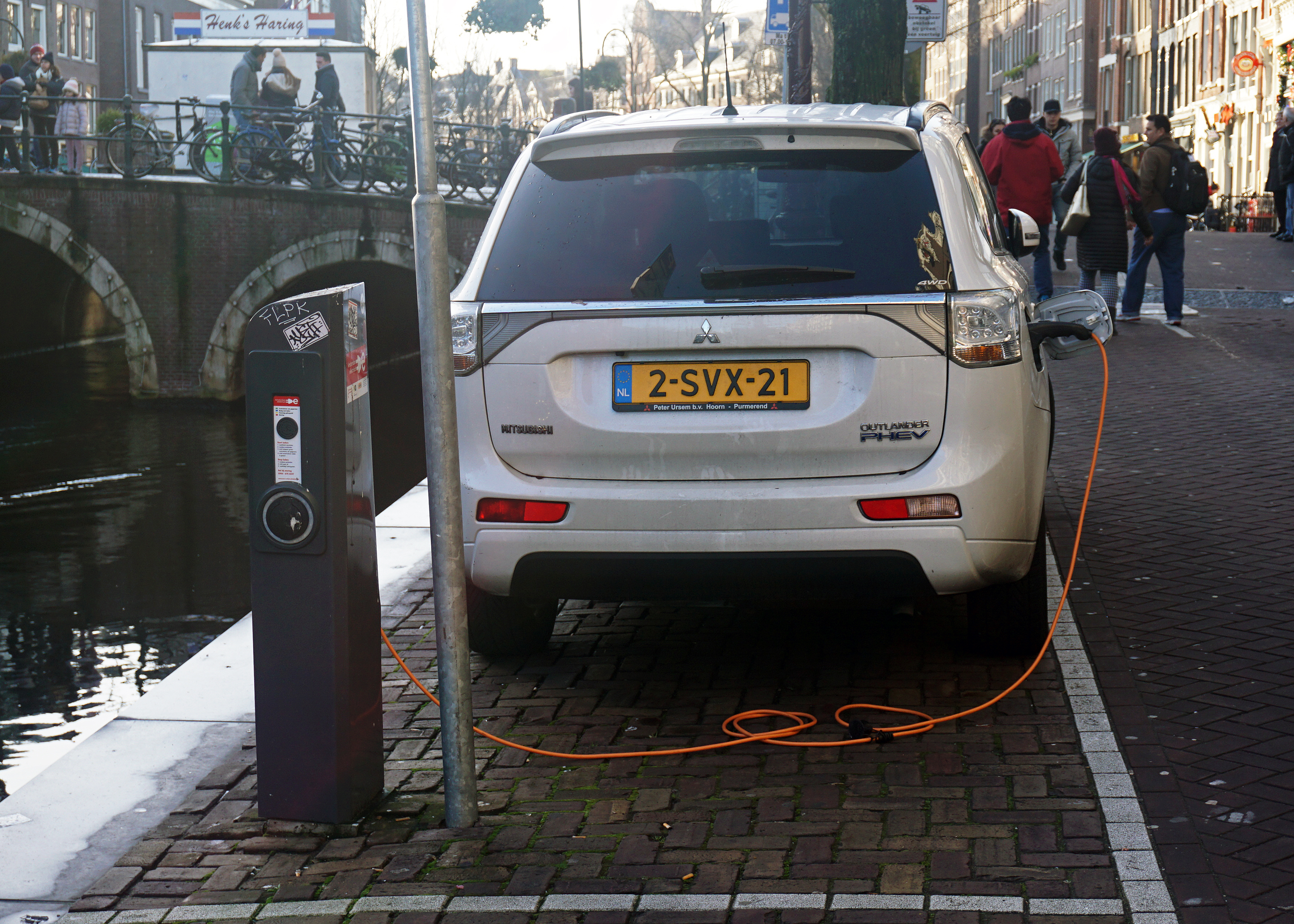
The Mitsubishi Outlander P-HEV is the all-time top selling plug-in electric vehicle in the Netherlands, with 25,984 units registered at the end of December 2016. Shown charging in Amsterdam.

A total of 5,397 plug-in cars were registered in the first half of 2016 representing a market share of the plug-in car segment of 2.8% of new car sales during the period. Sales during the first half of 2016 were down 64% year-on-year as a result of the changes in the tax rules that went into force at the beginning of 2016. A total of 9,185 plug-in passenger cars were registered in the first three quarters of 2016, consisting of 6,567 plug-in hybrids and 2,618 all-electric cars. The market share of the plug-in car segment captured 3.2% of new car sales during the period.

As of December 2016, the Outlander P-HEV remained as the all-time top-selling plug-in car in the country with 25,984 units registered at the end of that month. Ranking second is the Volvo V60 Plug-in Hybrid (15,804), followed by the Volkswagen Golf GTE (10,691), Volkswagen Passat GTE (7,773), Mercedes-Benz C 350 e (6,226), and the Tesla Model S (6,049). As of December 2016, the Model S listed as the country's all-time top selling all-electric car, and combined sales of Tesla Motors models represented almost half of the 13,105 all-electric cars registered in the country. As of December 2016, plug-in hybrids continued their dominance of the Dutch plug-in market, with 87% (98,903) of the country's stock of 113,636 passenger plug-in electric cars and vans registered at the end of December 2016.

=== 2017 ===
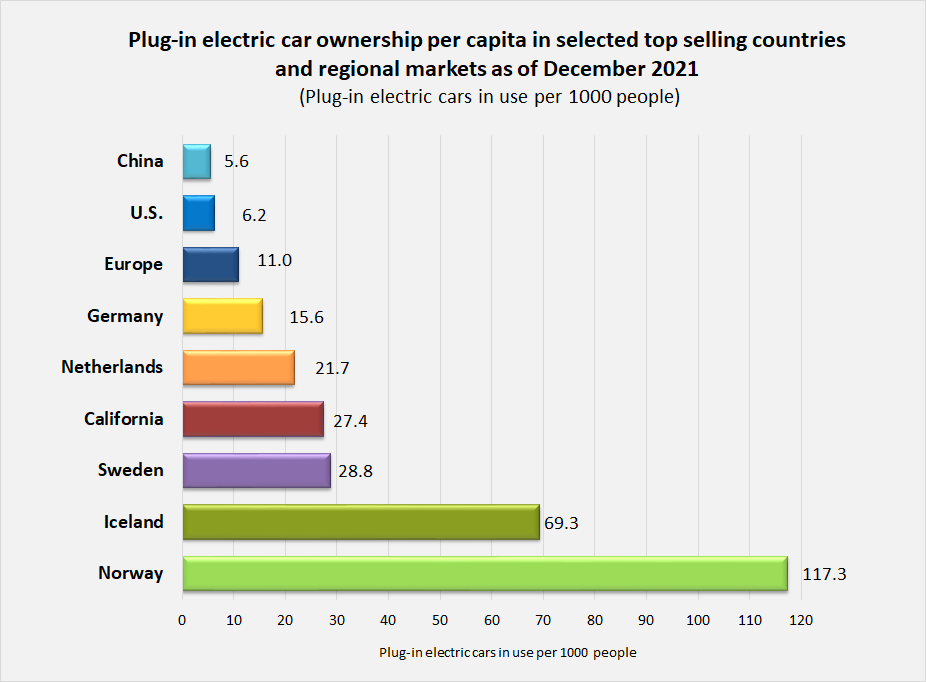
Comparison of the Dutch ownership of plug-in electric cars in use per 1,000 people with other top selling plug-in car countries and regional markets, as of December 2021.

With a total of 25,134 Mitsubishi Outlander P-HEVs registered in the country by the end of December 2017, the plug-in hybrid continued as the all-time top selling plug-in electric vehicle in the Netherlands. The Tesla Model S also continued as the best selling all-electric car with 8,028 units registered. As a result of the changes in tax rules, the plug-in market share declined from 9.9% in 2015, to 6.7% in 2016, and fell to 2.6% in 2017.

== Registrations by model ==
The following table presents annual registrations by model since 2009 through December 2015.

Registration of Top 10 plug-in electric cars by model in the Netherlands between 2009 and December 2015
Model	Total registrations 2009-2015^{(1)}	Market share 2009-2015^{(1)}	2015	2014	2013	2012	2011	2010	2009
Mitsubishi Outlander P-HEV	24,508	27.5%	8,757	7,712	8,039				
Volvo V60 Plug-in Hybrid	13,144	14.8%	3,851	3,126	6,144	23			
Volkswagen Golf GTE	8,584	9.6 %	8,183	401					
Opel Ampera	5,031	5.7%	80	41	2,207	2,695	8		
Tesla Model S	4,569	5.1%	1,842	1,533	1,194				
Audi A3 e-tron	4,434	5.0%	4,354	80					
Toyota Prius PHV	4,052	4.6%	81	87	2,699	1,184	1		
Volkswagen Passat GTE	2,879	3.2%	2,879						
Nissan Leaf	2,658	3.0%	571	1,022	497	269	299		
BMW i3	1,369	1.5%	574	544	251				
Ford C-Max Energi	1,229	1.4%	1,229						
Chevrolet Volt	1,062	1.2%	0	6	745	306	5		
Porsche Cayenne S E-Hybrid	1,047	1.2%	1,047						
Renault Zoe	1,022	1.1%	223	252	547				
BMW X5 xDrive40e	895	1.0%	895						
Smart electric drive	786	0.9%	192	219	53	55	267		
Renault Kangoo Z.E.	587	0.7%	587						
Nissan e-NV200	389	0.4%	199	190					
Porsche Panamera S E-Hybrid	328	0.4%	88	181	59				
Peugeot iOn	274	0.3%	0	0	17	175	82		
Fisker Karma	189	0.2%	1	0	48	140			
Citroën C-Zero	172	0.2%	0	6	29	110	27		
BMW 225xe Active Tourer	165	0.2%	165						
BMW i8	164	0.2%	108	56					
Mercedes-Benz B-Class Electric Drive	158	0.2%	158						
Mitsubishi i-MiEV	147	0.2%	8	7	52	13	62	5	
Mercedes-Benz S 500 e	143	0.2%	143						
Volkswagen e-Up!	137	0.2%	59	78					
Renault Fluence Z.E.	133	0.1%	0	1	13	115	4		
Th!nk City	118	0.1%	0	0	6	13	26	49	24
Tesla Roadster	101	0.1%	0	0	1	26	43	27	4
Kia Soul EV	100	0.1%	76	24					
Volkswagen e-Golf	81	0.1%	59	22					
BMW 330e	68	0.08%	68						
Mercedes-Benz GLE 500 e	60	0.07%	60						
Porsche 918 Spyder	15	0.02%	9	6					
Volkswagen XL1	5	0.006%	3	2					
McLaren P1	1	0.001%	0	1					
Total annual registrations of plug-in passenger cars^{(2)}			42,367	15,646	22,542	5,116	819	81	28
Total registered PEVs at the end of the year (plug-in passenger cars and utility vans)			88,991	45,020	29,342	6,258	1,141	395	68
Notes: (1) Market share as percentage of the 88,991 plug-in electric car registered in the Netherlands at the end of December 2015, consisting of all-electric cars, plug-in hybrids, and all-electric utility vans. (2) Only passenger car, all-electric vans not included

== See also ==
- Government incentives for plug-in electric vehicles
- List of modern production plug-in electric vehicles
- Renewable energy in the Netherlands
