= Besloten vennootschap =

Dutch and Belgian version of a private limited liability company

A besloten vennootschap (Dutch pronunciation: [bəˈsloːtə(ɱ) ˈvɛnoːtsxɑp], lit. "private partnership"; besloten vennootschap met beperkte aansprakelijkheid, lit. 'closed company with limited liability', abbr. bv) (Note: bvba in Belgium before 1 May 2019; sometimes also written b.V.) or société à responsabilité limitée (SRL) (Note: sprl in Belgium before 1 May 2019) is the Dutch and Belgian version of a private limited liability company. The company is owned by shareholders; the company's shares are privately registered and not freely transferable. It is the most common form of limited company in the Netherlands and Belgium.

A Dutch bv may be created by one or more individuals or legal entities, Dutch or foreign, with a minimum paid in capital of €1. A notarized deed of incorporation is executed and filed. The deed must be in Dutch. It must contain details of the incorporators, and of the initial Members of the Board, their amounts of participation and payments of initial capital. The deed also contains the Articles of Association, consisting of at least:

- the company name (which must begin or end with "bv")
- the city where the company has its registered seat
- the purpose of the company
- the issued share capital and paid-in capital
- the par value(s) of stock
- the conditions for share transfer

The authorized capital is the maximum capital that may subsequently be issued without altering the Articles of Association; it may be up to a maximum of five times the initial capital. Unlike its UK equivalent, a private company limited by shares, a bv company is not required to make its company accounts publicly available.

The specific legal format BV was introduced on 29 June 1971. Before that privately held limited companies were not distinguished from publicly tradeable companies with both being named naamloze vennootschap, or NV. After 1971 publicable tradeable companies retained the NV designation.

== Fiscal aspects ==
Corporate income tax will be levied on the profits of the bv. The general assembly of shareholders decide on what manner the profit after corporate tax will be distributed. The profits will be distributed to the shareholders as dividend. The bv is responsible for withholding the dividend tax on dividends due for payment to the shareholders. The usual dividend tax rate is 15%.

== Advantages ==
- Opening a Dutch BV company required minimum paid in capital €1.
- If the Dutch BV has an annual turnover of up to €20,000, it can take advantage of the small businesses scheme (KOR).
- If any non EU-resident qualifies as wealthy foreigner in the sense of Dutch immigration law, a 5 years resident permit can be obtained.
- The Dutch BV has one of the lowest tax rates in Western Europe.
- A BV may be formed and operated by non-resident persons.

== See also ==
- Types of business entity
- AB (Aktiebolag, the corresponding concept in Sweden)
- ApS (Anpartsselskab, the corresponding concept in Denmark)
- Co., Ltd./YK and GK (Yūgen gaisha and Gōdō gaisha, the corresponding concept in Japan)
- GmbH (Gesellschaft mit beschränkter Haftung, the corresponding concept in Germany, Austria and Switzerland)
- LLC (the corresponding concept in the United States)
- Ltd. (Limited, the corresponding concept in the UK, Ireland and Kenya)
- OY (Osakeyhtiö, the corresponding concept in Finland)
- Pty. Ltd. (proprietary company, the corresponding concept in Australia and South Africa)
- SARL (Société à responsabilité limitée, the corresponding concept in France, Morocco, Switzerland and Luxembourg)
- S.R.L. (Sociedad de responsabilidad limitada; Società a responsabilità limitata; Societate cu răspundere limitată, the corresponding concept in Argentina, Italy (S.r.l.) and Romania respectively)
