= Rosenstein =

Rosenstein (German pronunciation: [ˈʁoːzn̩ˌʃtaɪ̯n]) is surname of German and Yiddish origin. It may refer to:

== People ==
- Allen B. Rosenstein (1920–2018), American systems engineers and UCLA Professor
- Avraham Rosenstein, original name of Avraham Even-Shoshan
- Barry Rosenstein, American hedge fund manager
- Carl von Rosenstein (1766–1836), Archbishop of Uppsala
- Elhanan Rosenstein (1796–1869), rabbi who served in Berlin from 1846 until 1869
- Erna Rosenstein (1913–2004), Austrian surrealist painter and poet
- Glenn Rosenstein, American record producer, engineer, sound mixer, and guitarist
- Hank Rosenstein (1920–2010), former professional American basketball player
- Justin Rosenstein (born 1983), American software programmer and entrepreneur
- Leo Rosenstein, original name of Leo Stein (1861–1921), Austrian playwright and librettist
- Måns von Rosenstein (1755–1801), Swedish Navy rear admiral
- Moshe Rosenstein (1880–1941), Lithuanian rabbi
- Nettie Rosenstein (1890–1980), Jewish-American fashion designer
- Nils Rosén von Rosenstein (1706–1773), Swedish physician
- Nils von Rosenstein (1752–1824), Swedish civil servant and propagator for enlightenment thinking
- Paul Rosenstein-Rodan (1902–1985), Austrian economist
- Rod Rosenstein (born 1965), Deputy Attorney General of the United States Department of Justice
- Samuel Murray Rosenstein (1909–1995), judge of the United States Customs Court
- Samuel Siegmund Rosenstein (1832–1906), German physician
- Willi Rosenstein (1892–1949), German flying ace in World War I
- Zeev Rosenstein (born 1954), infamous Israeli drug trafficker

== Places ==
- 21467 Rosenstein, main-belt asteroid
- Castle Rosenstein, in the Bad Cannstatt district of Stuttgart, Germany
- Museum am Rosenstein, part of the State Museum of Natural History in Stuttgart
- Rosenstein Park, English garden in Stuttgart, Germany
- Rosenstein (Swabian Jura), mountain in Germany
- Rosenstein Tunnel, the name of several past, present and planned tunnels in the Stuttgart area
