= List of tunnels in Germany =

A list of tunnels in Germany longer than 10 metres.

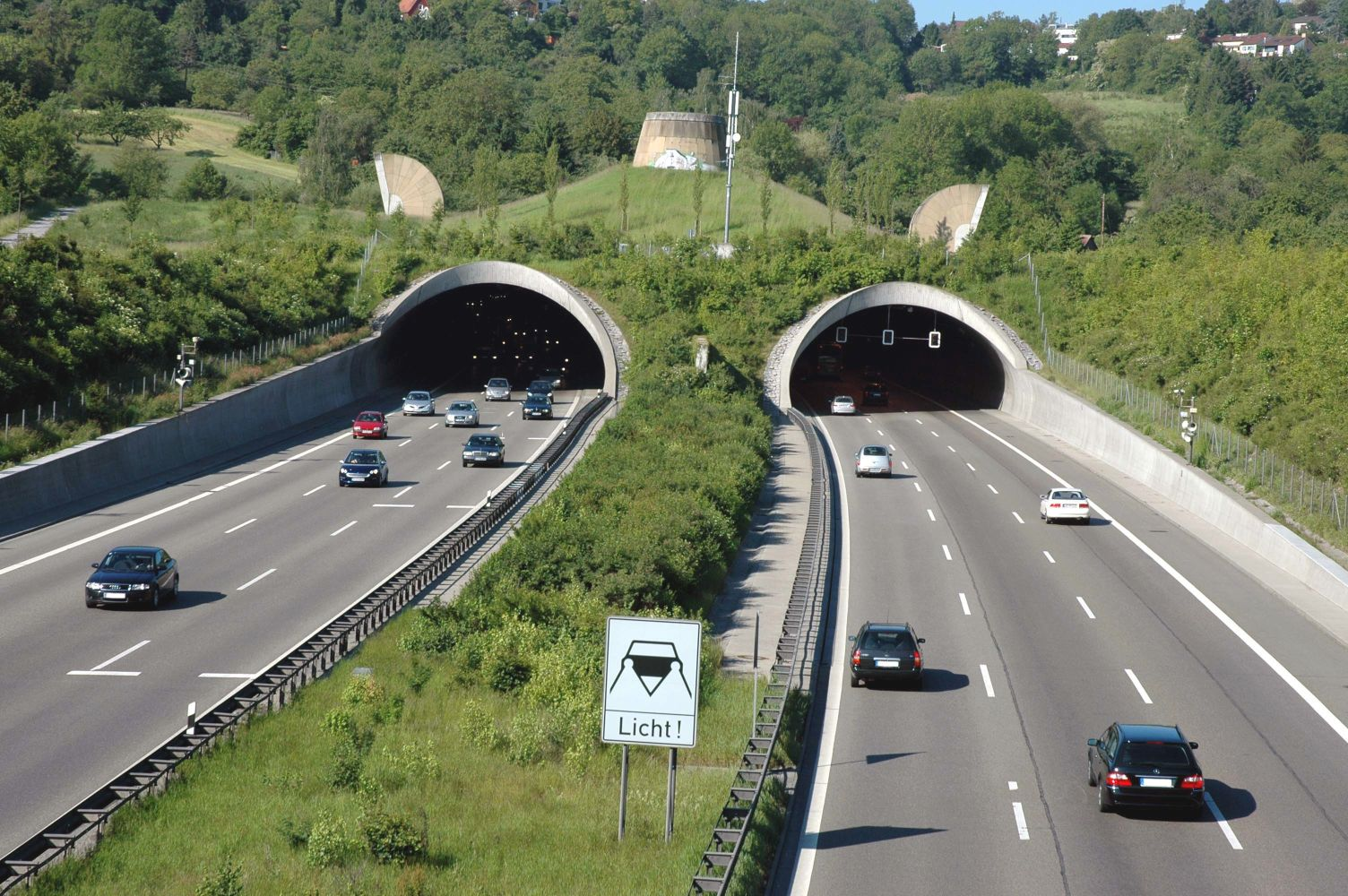
North entrance of the Engelberg Tunnel (June 2006)

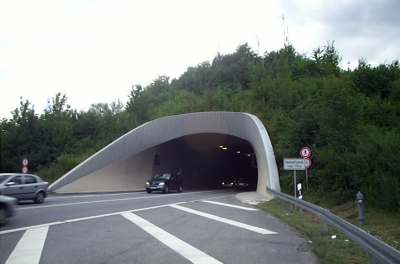
The longest single-tube road tunnel in Germany north of the Alps: the Saukopf Tunnel between Birkenau (Hesse) and Weinheim (Baden-Württemberg)

== Baden-Württemberg ==
=== Road tunnels ===
- Saukopf Tunnel (2.715 m)
- Michael Tunnel (2544 m)
- Engelberg Tunnel (2.530 m)
- Heslach Tunnel (2.300 m, Stuttgart)
- Pragsattel Tunnel (720 m; at Prag in Stuttgart)
- Kappelberg Tunnel
- Schlossberg Tunnel, Tübingen
- Schönbuch Tunnel
- Hölzern Tunnel
- Schwäbisch Gmünd Tunnel (2.200 m)
- Schlossberg Tunnel, Heidelberg (916 m)
- Wagenburg Tunnel (824 m, Stuttgart)
- Wattkopf Tunnel (1950 m near Ettlingen)
- Meistern Tunnel (1684 m, Bad Wildbad)

==== Speed limit ====
With few exceptions, Baden-Württemberg has a speed limit of 100 km/h for all road and motorway tunnels that have two tubes. It is the only German state where this is the case; other German states have had a speed limit of 80 km/h. Bavaria has been raising the speed limit in such tunnels from 80 km/h to 100 km/h since 2007, and North Rhine-Westphalia has been doing the same since 2008.

=== Railway tunnels ===
- Karlsruhe–Mühlacker railway: Pforzheim Tunnel.
- Ammer Valley Railway: • Schlossberg Tunnel, Tübingen
- Stuttgart–Horb railway: • Kriegsberg Tunnel (579 m) • Hasenberg Tunnel (258 m)
- Plochingen–Immendingen railway: • Tierstein Tunnel (656 m) • Sulzau Tunnel (493 m)
- New and improved Karlsruhe–Basel railway line: • Katzenberg Tunnel (9,385 m,) • Rastatt Tunnel (4,270 m, under construction)
- Mannheim–Stuttgart high speed railway: • Altenberg Tunnel (220 m) • Burgberg Tunnel (1.115 m) • Forst Tunnel (1,727 m) • Freudenstein Tunnel (6,800 m) • Langes Feld Tunnel (4,632 m) • Markstein Tunnel (2,782 m) • Neuenberg Tunnel (762 m) • Pfingstberg Tunnel (5,380 m) • Pulverding Tunnel (1,878 m) • Rollenberg Tunnel (3,303 m) • Saubuckel Tunnel (403 m) • Simonsweingarten Tunnel (420 m) • Wilfenberg Tunnel (1,006 m)
- Badische Schwarzwald Railway: • Eisenberg Tunnel (792 m) • Farrenhalde Tunnel (313 m) • Forellen Tunnel (64 m) • Gaisloch Tunnel (54 m) • Glasträg Tunnel I (23 m) • Glasträg Tunnel II (43 m) • Glasträg Tunnel III (18 m) • Gremmelsbach Tunnel (912 m) • Großer Triberg Tunnel (835 m) • Großhalde Tunnel (327 m) • Grundwald Tunnel (381 m) • Gummambs Tunnel (365 m) • Hippensbach Tunnel (365 m) • Hohenack Tunnel (41 m) • Hohnen Tunnel (327 m) • Kleiner Triberg Tunnel (92 m) • Krähenloch Tunnel (224 m) • Kurzenberg Tunnel (324 m) • Letschenberg Tunnel (129 m) • Losbach Tunnel (185 m) • Möhring Tunnel (180 m) • Mühlhalde Tunnel (64 m) • Niederwass Tunnel (558 m) • Obergieß Tunnel (175 m) • Rebberg Tunnel (53 m) • Röllerwald Tunnel (162 m) • Schieferhalde Tunnel (93 m) • Seelenwald Tunnel I (48 m) • Seelenwald Tunnel II (69 m) • Seelenwald Tunnel III (195 m) • Sommerau Tunnel (1,697 m) • Sommerberg Tunnel (51 m) • Spärle Tunnel (80 m) • Steinbis Tunnel (63 m) • Tannenbühl Tunnel (25 m) • Tannenwald Tunnel (166 m) • Tunnel beim 3. Bauer (88 m) • Tunnel beim 4. Bauer (313 m) • Hatting Tunnel (900 m; also Gäu Railway)
- Stuttgart: • Filder Tunnel (9,468 m, planned as part of the Stuttgart–Wendlingen high-speed railway) • Prag Tunnel (on Franconia Railway) • Rosenstein Tunnel (on Fils Valley Railway) • Tunnel on the Stuttgart Link Line (part of the Stuttgart S-Bahn) (8,788 m, longest S-Bahn tunnel in Germany)
- Neckar Valley Railway: • Königstuhl Tunnel (2,486 m)

== Bavaria ==
=== Road tunnels ===
- Allach Tunnel
- Aubing Tunnel
- Farchant Tunnel
- Füssen Border Tunnel
- Hofberg Tunnel
- Tunnels in Munich:
  - Altstadtring Tunnel
  - Biederstein Tunnel
  - Brudermühl Tunnel
  - Candid Tunnel
  - Effner Tunnel
  - Innsbrucker Ring Tunnel
  - Landshuter Allee Tunnel
  - Leuchtenbergring Tunnel
  - Petuel Tunnel
  - Richard Strauss Tunnel
  - Trappentreu Tunnel
- Neubiberg Tunnel
- Pfaffenstein Tunnel
- Schwarzer Berg Tunnel
- Wendelberg Tunnel

==== Speed limit ====
In 2007, Bavaria became the second German state, after Baden-Württemberg, to start increasing the speed limit for road and motorway tunnels with two tubes from 80 to 100 km/h. The first tunnel to have its speed limit increased from 80 to 100 km/h was the overhead noise barrier tunnel on the A3 auto Railway at Aschaffenburg. The Allach tunnel will be next, following the next scheduled maintenance. The AubingTunnel on the Munich motorway ring is already designed for speeds of 100 km/h and is scheduled to be re-classified.

=== Railway tunnels ===
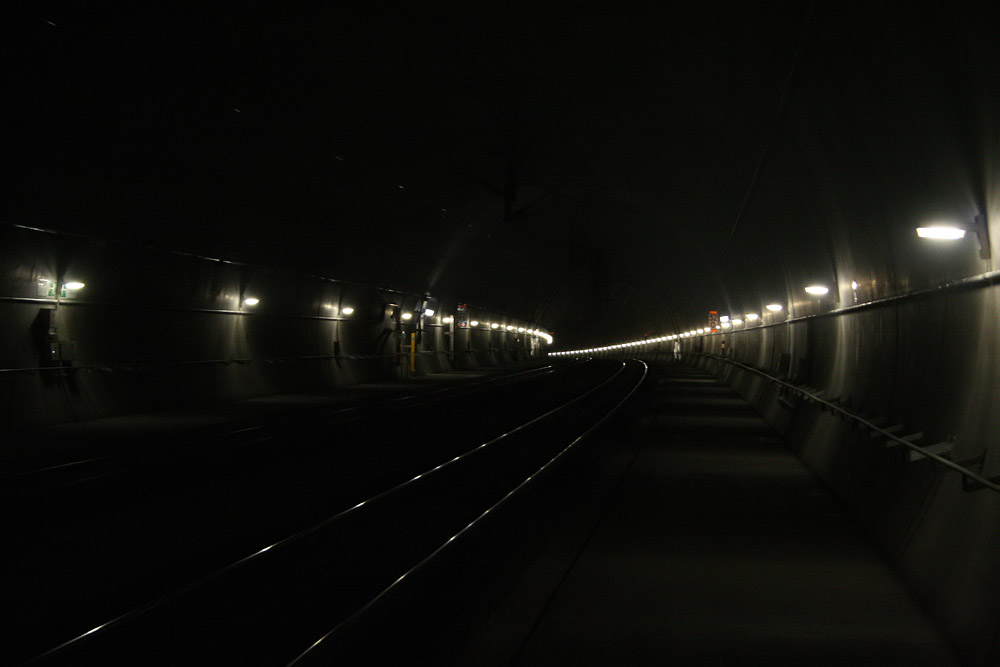
The Euerwang Tunnel is the third longest overground-railway tunnel in Germany. It was designed to slope toward the two exits so that trains can leave the tunnel without power in emergencies.

- Hanover–Würzburg high speed railway (Bavarian section): Dittenbrunn Tunnel, Burgsinn Tunnel, Sinnberg Tunnel, Einmalberg Tunnel, Mühlberg Tunnel, Hanfgarten Tunnel, Hohe Wart Tunnel, Espenloh Tunnel, Eichelberg Tunnel, Neuberg Tunnel, Roßberg Tunnel, Steinberg Tunnel
  - Nantenbach Curve: Schönrain Tunnel, Herrbach Tunnel, Ständelberg Tunnel, Rammersberg Tunnel
- Nuremberg–Ingolstadt high-speed railway: Göggelsbuch Tunnel, Offenbau Tunnel, Euerwang Tunnel, Schellenberg Tunnel, Irlahüll Tunnel, Denkendorf Tunnel, Stammham Tunnel, Geisberg Tunnel, Audi Tunnel
- More tunnels (selection): Altengronau Forst Tunnel, Burgberg Tunnel (near Erlangen), Felstor Tunnel (Regensburg–Nuremberg line, at 16 metres this used to be the shortest tunnel in Germany), Schwarzkopf Tunnel (Aschaffenburg–Würzburg line)
- Munich S-Bahn trunk line

=== Underground railway systems ===
- Munich U-Bahn
- Nuremberg U-Bahn

== Berlin ==
=== Road tunnels ===
- Tiergarten Tunnel

=== Railway tunnels ===
- Nord-Süd Tunnel
- Berlin North–South mainline: Tiergarten Tunnel

=== Underground railway systems ===
- Berlin U-Bahn

== Hamburg ==
=== Road tunnels ===
- New Elbe tunnel
- Kronstieg Tunnel
- Old Elbe tunnel
- Wallring Tunnel
- Sengelmannstraße Tunnel
- Tunnel A1 at Moorfleet
- Deichtor Tunnel
- Bus tunnel in Veddel
- Binsbarg Tunnel
- Alsterkrugchaussee Tunnel
- Einhausung Holtkoppel
- CCH Tunnel
- Unterführung A23, Dreieck NW
- Unterführung A23, Eidelstedt

=== Railway tunnels ===
- Schellfisch Tunnel
- Hamburg Airport S-Bahn tunnel
- Hamburg City S-Bahn tunnel
- Central Station S-Bahn tunnel
- Harburg S-Bahn tunnel

=== Underground railway systems ===
- Hamburg U-Bahn

== Hesse ==
=== Road tunnels ===
- Saukopf Tunnel (2.715 m)
- Hopfenberg Tunnel
- Walberg Tunnel
- Lohberg Tunnel (1080 m)
- Schiede Tunnel in Limburg
- Schlossberg Tunnel in Dillenburg
- Mühlberg Tunnel in Weilburg
- Overhead noise barrier tunnel in Dalheim
- Theatre Tunnel
- Schürzeberg road tunnel (where the B27 crosses the Schürzeberg railway tunnel)

=== Railway tunnels ===
- On the Cologne–Frankfurt high speed railway (section in Hesse, north–south): Elzer Berg Tunnel (state border, northern entrance in Rhineland-Palatinate), Limburg Tunnel, Idstein Tunnel, Niedernhausen Tunnel, Hellenberg Tunnel, Schulwald Tunnel, Breckenheim Tunnel, Kelsterbacher Spange Tunnel, Frankfurter-Kreuz Tunnel
- On the Hanover–Würzburg high speed railway (section in Hesse): Lohberg Tunnel, Rengershausen Tunnel, Dörnhagen Tunnel, Kehrenberg Tunnel, Erbelberg Tunnel, Hainbuch Tunnel, Kaiserau Tunnel, Weltkugel Tunnel, Wildsberg Tunnel, Sengeberg Tunnel, Schalkenberg Tunnel, Hainrode Tunnel, Mühlbach Tunnel, Schmitteberg Tunnel, Kalter-Sand Tunnel, Schickeberg Tunnel, Krämerskuppe Tunnel, Kirchheim Tunnel, Hattenberg Tunnel, Warteküppel Tunnel, Richthof Tunnel, Dornbusch Tunnel, Witzelhöhe Tunnel, Eichberg Tunnel, Dietershan Tunnel, Sulzhof Tunnel, Hartberg Tunnel, Kalbach Tunnel, Bornheck Tunnel, Landrücken Tunnel, Schwarzenfels Tunnel
- railway Bebra–Göttingen: • Bebenroth Tunnel (930 m) • Cornberg Tunnel (719 m) • Schürzeberg Tunnel (173 m)
- Frankfurt City Tunnel, (5500/6000 m)
- Offenbach City Tunnel, (3700 m)
- Frau-Nauses Tunnel (1205 m, Odenwald Railway)
- Hasselborn Tunnel (1300 m, Solmsbach Valley Railway)
- Krähberg Tunnel (3100 m, longest single-track railway tunnel in Germany, Odenwald Railway)
- Schlüchtern Tunnel (3575 m, Kinzig Valley Railway)

=== Underground railway systems ===
- Frankfurt U-Bahn

=== Ship tunnels ===
- Weilburg Ship tunnel

== Mecklenburg-Vorpommern ==
=== Road tunnels ===
- Warnow Tunnel

== Lower Saxony ==
=== Road tunnels ===
- Butterberg Tunnel
- Ems Tunnel
- Heidkopf Tunnel
- Wes Tunnel

=== Railway tunnels ===
- Tunnels of the Hanover–Würzburg high speed railway in Lower Saxony: Escherberg Tunnel, Eichenberg Tunnel, Eggeberg Tunnel, Riesberg Tunnel, Helleberg Tunnel, Wadenberg Tunnel, Hopfenberg Tunnel, Sohlberg Tunnel, Krieberg Tunnel, Leinebusch Tunnel, Endelskamp Tunnel, Mackenrodt Tunnel, Rauheberg Tunnel, Münden Tunnel, Mühlenkopf Tunnel.
- Naens Tunnel, Ippens Tunnel (both Altenbeken–Kreiensen railway)
- Ertinghäus Tunnel, Wahmbeck Tunnel (both Solling Railway)
- Walkenried Tunnel (South Harz line)

== North Rhine-Westphalia ==
=== Road tunnels ===
- Burgholz Tunnel
- Düsseldorf Airport tunnel
- Kiesberg Tunnel
- Kruin Tunnel (90 m) road and rail tunnel
- Bad Godesberg Tunnel
- Rhineallee Tunnel
- Rhineuf Tunnel (Düsseldorf)
- Rhineuf Tunnel (Cologne)
- Ruhrschnellweg Tunnel
- Berghofen Tunnel
- Wersten Tunnel
- University tunnel
- Weserauen Tunnel
- Hüttentalstraße tunnels in Siegen, including Ziegenberg Tunnel, Bühl Tunnel

=== Railway tunnels ===
- Busch Tunnel (691 bzw. 711 m)
- Egge Tunnel (2880 m)
- Ende Tunnel (944 m)
- Gemmenich Tunnel (870 m)
- Goldberg Tunnel (2200 m)
- Heinsberg Tunnel (1303 m)
- Hösel Tunnel (327 m)
- Ichenberg Tunnel (95 m)
- Lengerich Tunnel (581 m)
- Königsdorf Tunnel (1623 m)
- Kruin Tunnel: road and rail tunnels
- Reels Tunnel
- Rehberg Tunnel (1632 m)
- Rottbitze Tunnel (990 m)
- Rott Tunnel (351 m)
- Rudersdorf Tunnel (2651 m)
- Schee Tunnel (722 m)
- Schloss-Röttgen Tunnel (1047 m)
- Siesel Tunnel (95 m)
- Tunnel Troisdorf (627 m)
- Tunnels of the Cologne–Rhine/Main high speed railway: u. a. Siegauen Tunnel, Ittenbach Tunnel, Aegidienberg Tunnel
- Tunnel in the borough of Wuppertal

== Rhineland-Palatinate ==
=== Road tunnels ===
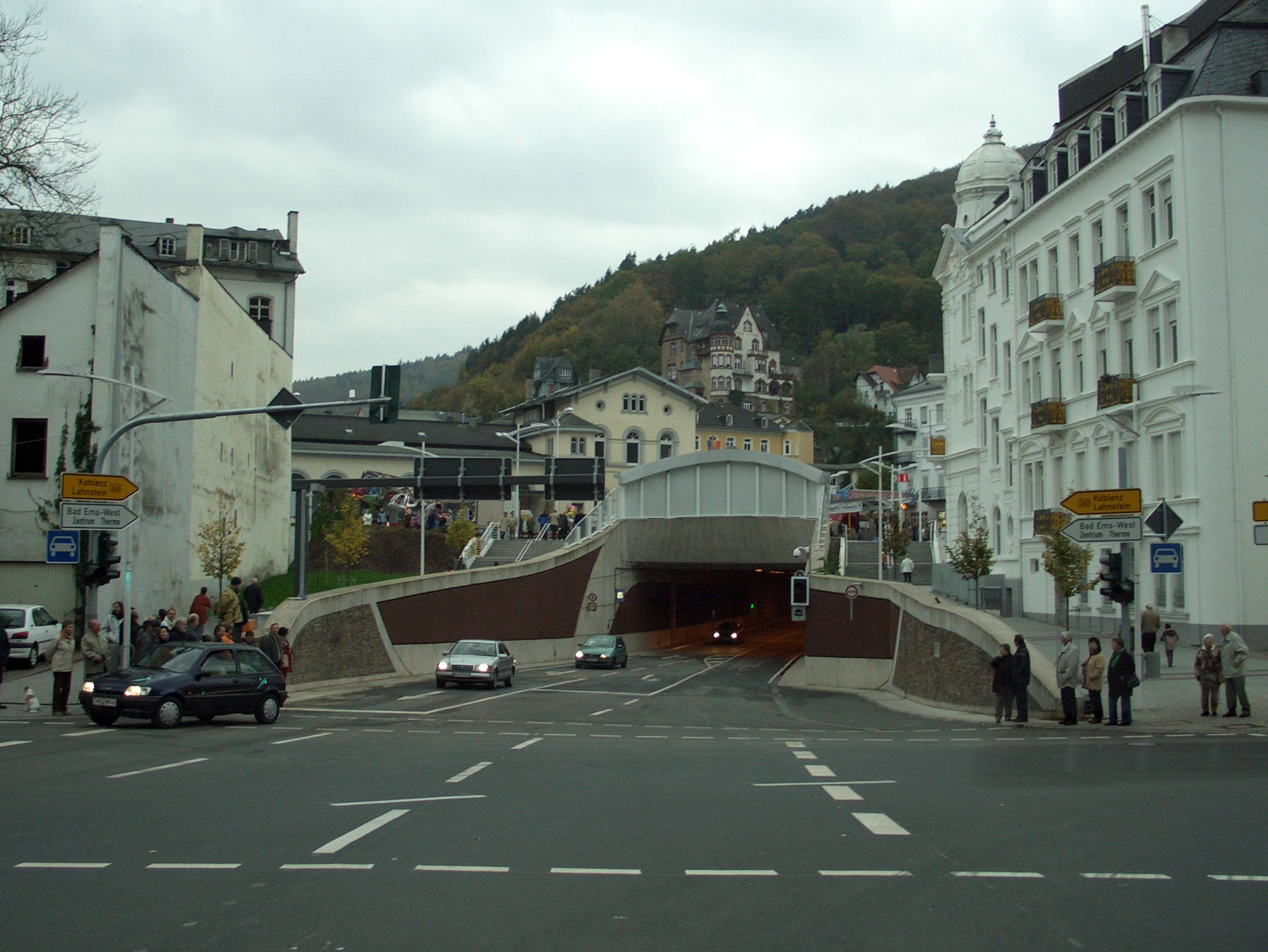
Malberg Tunnel at Bad Ems

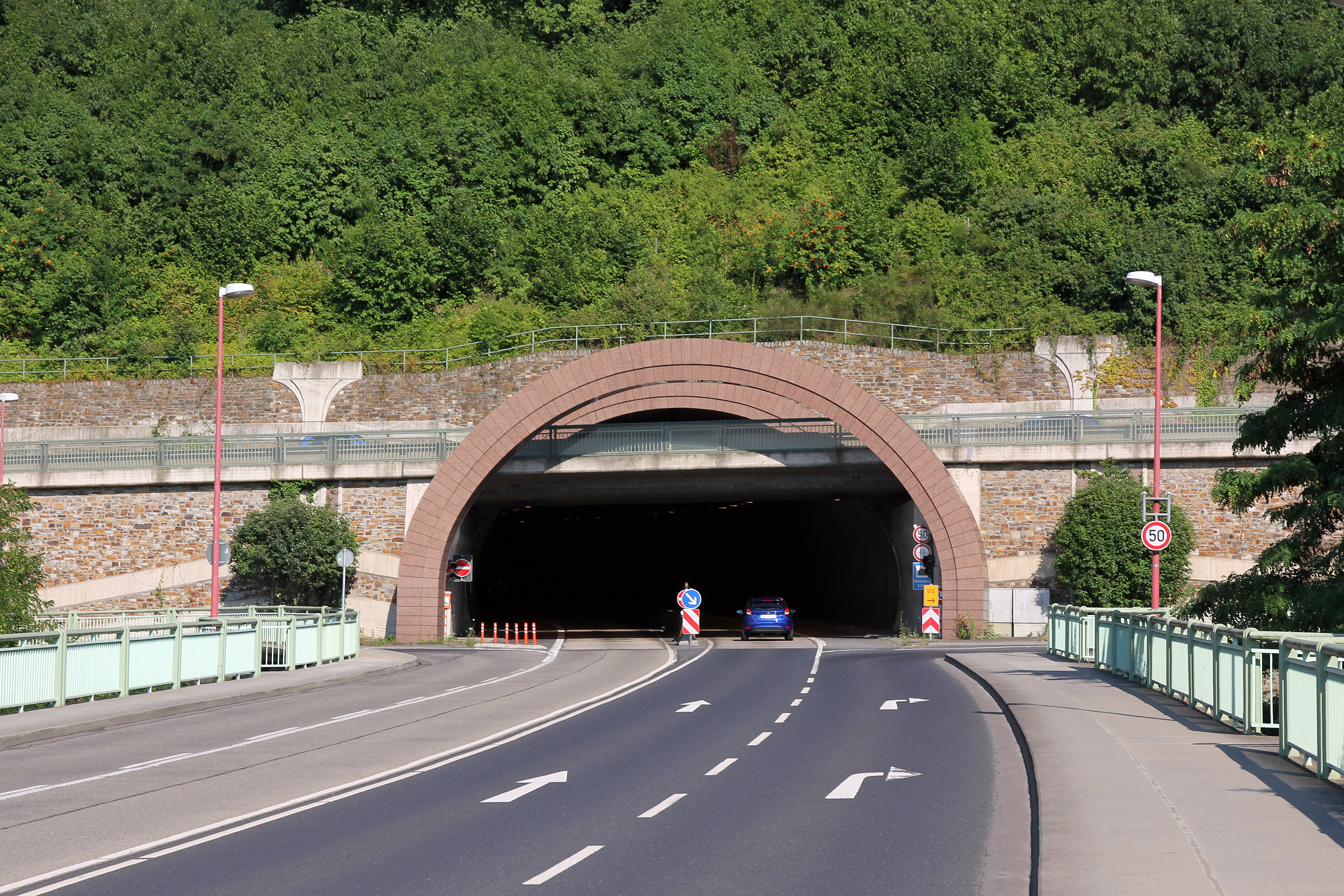
Glockenberg Tunnel at Koblenz

- B 260 Malberg Tunnel at Bad Ems, Length = 1600 m. Major part of the spa's bypass road. Longest road tunnel in Rhineland-Palatinate. Two-lane road tunnel, separate tubes. Cut-and-cover construction. Inaugurated 4 November 2006, Opened to traffic 5 November 2006.
- B 10 Stauf Tunnel at Sarnstall, Length = 1038 m
- A 62 Hörnchenberg Tunnel at Landstuhl, Length = 510 + 485 m
- B 10 Barbarossa Tunnel at Annweiler, Length = 616 m
- B 257 Ditschardt Tunnel at Altenahr, Length = 565 m
- K 101 Burgberg Tunnel at Bernkastel-Kues, Length = 560 m
- B 10 Fehrbach Tunnel at Pirmasens, length = 250+230 m
- L 103 Apollo Tunnel at Bad Bertrich, length = 441 m
- B 10 Löwenherz Tunnel at Annweiler, length = 405 m
- B 62 Siegkreisel Tunnel at Betzdorf, length = 378 m
- B 41 Altenberg Tunnel at Idar-Oberstein, length = 319 m
- B 10 Kostenfels Tunnel at Rinntal, length = 304m
- B 49 Glockenberg Tunnel at Koblenz, length = 294 m
- A 65 Queichheim Tunnel at Landau, length = 110+110 m
- B 257 Lingenberg Tunnel at Altenahr, length = 212 m
- L 103 Diana Tunnel at Bad Bertrich, length = 193 m
- B 407 Laurentius Tunnel at Saarburg, length = 185 m
- B 41 Hellberg Tunnel at Kirn (Nahe), length = 161 m
- B 257 Übigs Tunnel at Altenahr, length = 94 m
- B 260 Lindenbach Tunnel at Bad Ems, length = 93 m
- B 42 Lahneck Tunnel at Lahnstein, length = 86 m
- B 267 Engelslei Tunnel at Altenahr, length = 69 m
- L132 Altstadt Tunnel in Saarburg, length = 55 m

=== Railway tunnels ===
- Kaiser Wilhelm Tunnel (4205 m, Koblenz–Trier railway)
- Wilseck Tunnel, 1268 m (Eifel Railway)
- East Rhine Railway: • Horchheim Tunnel (576 m) • Loreley Tunnel (368/417 m) • Roßstein Tunnel (378/457 m)
- Mainz railway tunnels: Three separate tunnels with a length of 655 m, 240 m and 1297 m, respectively
- Marienthal Tunnel (1050 m, Engers–Au railway)
- Palatine Ludwig Railway: • Wolfsberg Tunnel (320 m) • Lichtensteiner Kopf Tunnel (92 m) • Retschbach Tunnel (196 m) • Schönberg-Langeck Tunnel (366 m) • Mainzer Berg Tunnel (212 m) • Gipp Tunnel (217 m) • Köpfle Tunnel (158 m) • Eisenkehl Tunnel (65 m) • Kehre Tunnel (302 m) • Schloßberg Tunnel (208 m) • Franzosenwoog Tunnel (79 m) • Heiligenberg Tunnel (1347 m)
- Alsenz Valley Railway: • Altenhof Tunnel (436 m) • Kupferschmelz Tunnel (82 m) • Imsweil Tunnel (373 m) • Alsenz Tunnel (283 m)

== Saarland ==
=== Road tunnels ===
- Pellinger Berg Tunnel

Not yet upgraded in accordance with the RABT 2006 Guideline for Road Tunnel Equipment and Operation.

=== Railway tunnels ===
- Mettlach Tunnel (1196 m)
- Merchweil Tunnel (624 m)
- Bildstock Tunnel (341 m)
- WiebelskircheTunnel (313 m)
- Bierfeld Tunnel (216 m)
- Schanzenberg Tunnel (248 m)
- Silvingen Tunnel (1715 m) abandoned
- Varus Tunnel (435 m) abandoned
- Wehrden Tunnel (104 m) partly abandoned

== Saxony ==
=== Road tunnels ===
- Königshainer Berge Tunnel (3300 m)
- Altfranken Tunnel (345 m)
- Dölzschen Tunnel
- Coschütz Tunnel
- Bramsch Tunnel in Dresden
- Central Station tunnel in Dresden
- Schottenberg tunnel in Meißen (719 m) – with a 5% gradient the steepest tunnel in Germany
- Bundesstraße 93 Tunnel in Zwickau (380 m)

=== Railway tunnels ===
Tunnel	Line	Opened	Length in m	Comment
Amtshainersdorf Tunnel 1	Sebnitz Valley Railway		89	
Amtshainersdorf Tunnel 2	Sebnitz Valley Railway		91	
Dresden Airport Tunnel	Dresden Airport S-Bahn		570	
Geising Tunnel	Müglitz Valley Railway		235	
Gleisberg Tunnel	Müglitz Valley Railway		593	
Köttewitz Tunnel	Müglitz Valley Railway		198	
Oberau Tunnel	Leipzig–Dresden		513	
Pilz Tunnel	Müglitz Valley Railway		292	
Rathmannsdorf Tunnel	Sebnitz Valley Railway		377	
Sebnitz Tunnel	Sebnitz Valley Railway		148	
Edle Krone Tunnel	Dresden–Werdau		122	
Ulbersdorf Tunnel 1	Sebnitz Valley Railway		108	
Ulbersdorf Tunnel 2	Sebnitz Valley Railway		91	
Ulbersdorf Tunnel 1	Sebnitz Valley Railway		77	
Weesenstein Tunnel	Müglitz Valley Railway		240	

== Schleswig-Holstein ==
=== Road tunnels ===
- Rendsburg Canal Tunnel
- Herrentunnel

== Thuringia ==
=== Road tunnels ===
- Rennsteig Tunnel
