= SWB =

SWB may refer to:

- Freediving blackout § Shallow water blackout, blackout which occurs when all phases of a breathhold dive have taken place in shallow water
- Börse Stuttgart, Stuttgart Stock Exchange code
- Maore dialect, ISO 639-3 code for the Maore dialect of the Comorian language
- Smith & Wesson's stock listing symbol on the New York Stock Exchange
- Subjective well-being, a self-reported measure of psychological well-being
- A short wheelbase vehicle
- Slyck Wagner Brown, a professional wrestler
- South Wales Borderers, a line infantry regiment of the British Army from 1689 to 1969
- SWB Railriders, a Minor League Baseball team from the Scranton/Wilkes-Barre area of Pennsylvania
