= Samuel Rosenstein =

Samuel Rosenstein may refer to:

- Samuel Murray Rosenstein (1909–1995), judge for the United States Customs Court
- Samuel Siegmund Rosenstein (1832–1906), German physician
