= Solactive =

German financial data service provider

Solactive AG
- Company type: Private
- Industry: Financial services
- Founded: 2007
- Headquarters: Frankfurt, Germany
- Key people: Steffen Scheuble (CEO)
- Services: Stock market indexes
- Number of employees: 300~ (2026)
- Website: www.solactive.com

Solactive is a German-based company established in 2007 and specializes in the provision of financial indices. The company is headquartered in Frankfurt, Germany, but also maintains offices in Berlin and Dresden. Since 2017, Solactive has expanded its global presence with offices in Toronto, Hong Kong, and Amsterdam.

The company develops, calculates, and markets cost-efficient indices over several asset classes. In 2010, there were 25 exchange-traded funds (ETF) linked to indices calculated by Solactive, which reached more than 450 ETFs in October 2019. As of 2026, Solactive claims to calculate over 15,000 indices, which are used for ETFs, structured products and benchmarks for active funds.

== History ==
Solactive was founded in October 2007 by Steffen Scheuble under the name of Structured Solutions, prior to the 2008 financial crisis.

In 2009, Solactive acquired the S-Box index platform from the Stuttgart Stock Exchange. This acquisition led to the development of Solactive's IT infrastructure. On May 13, 2011, the company switched to a new index calculation platform.

In July 2013, the company was rebranded Solactive following a dispute with another index provider.

In March 2014, Solactive Green Bond Index was launched. By December of the same year, the company had 170 ETFs, with over US$25 billion linked.

In December 2015, 200 ETFs were linked to indices calculated by Solactive and by March 2016, the company ranked third in the United States in terms of ETFs tied to its calculated indices. It was also during 2015 that Solactive began to build the company's support functions, such as HR, Legal, and Accounting.

From 2017, Solactive began to expand globally. In July 2017, Solactive opened an office in Toronto. In October 2018, Solactive was established in Hong Kong, and in 2021, Solactive opened an office in Amsterdam following the acquisition of the Dutch index provider, Global Property Research B.V. (GPR).

In April 2019, Solactive achieved registration as a benchmark administrator under the European Benchmarks Regulation (BMR) with the BaFin.

In May 2019, Solactive announced that it has made a strategic investment in Minerva Analytics Ltd, the ESG research firm and proxy voting agency.

== Products ==
Solactive is managed by Steffen Scheuble (CEO), Timo Pfeiffer (CMO) and Nicolas Bös (CTO), and organized in two business units: Index management and product development.

Solactive offers two approaches to index development. The first approach is to create Solactive branded indices, such as the Solactive Smart City Index or the Solactive eGaming Index. The second is their white-label index calculation services, such as the BNP Paribas Global Agribusiness Total Return Index or the J.P. Morgan ERP Dividend Yield Long Index. This service includes the index calculation and administration.

Solactive achieved its registration as a Benchmark Administrator with the German Federal Financial Supervisory Authority (BaFin) in 2019, which enables the administration of benchmarks under the Benchmark Regulation in Europe.

Solactive has the Solactive US Broad Market Index. In May 2018, Solactive introduced its proprietary Global Benchmark Series (GBS). The index family includes around 2,000 equity indices; selection based on the Solactive Country Classification Framework.

Solactive has launched the Solactive Green Bond Index and the Solactive ISS ESG Beyond Plastic Waste Index, iNAV or IOPV, and the production of a PCF (Portfolio Composition File).

== See also ==
- Stock market index
- Exchange-traded fund
- Structured products
