= Saigon Asset Management =

- Type: Private
- Industry: Investment management
- Founded: 2007
- Headquarters: Cayman Islands
- Area served: Vietnam
- Key people: Louis Nguyen (founder)
- Products: Asset management
- AUM: ▲US$125 million (2014)
- Website: saigonam.com

Saigon Asset Management (SAM) is a fund management and investment banking firm domiciled in the Cayman Islands with an initial focus on Vietnam that subsequently expanded to the ASEAN region. It was founded in 2007 by Louis Nguyen, and as of 2014 had total assets under management of US$125 million. Its Vietnam office is based in Ho Chi Minh City.

SAM Investment Banking provides private placement, mergers & acquisitions, and corporate finance services in the infrastructure, energy and natural resources sectors. SAM has completed projects in Indonesia, Malaysia, Lao PDR, Cambodia and Myanmar.

== Investment Funds ==
SAM managed a Vietnam-focused, open-end investment fund that was launched in August 2007 and converted from a closed-end fund in June 2013. The fund was listed on the Stuttgart Stock Exchange.

- Vietnam Equity Holding (VEH) is an equity fund investing in companies with significant exposure to Vietnam. In June 2018, at an Extraordinary General Meeting of Shareholders, a resolution was passed approving a soft wind down of VEH, and the board began an orderly liquidation of the fund's assets. In December 2019, the directors announced that compulsory redemption would take place.
- Vietnam Property Holding (VPH) was a real estate fund investing in a portfolio of listed property developers and development projects in Vietnam that has since merged with VEH as of June 2017.
- Vietnam Impact Holding (VIH), which aims to invest in private companies "which support sustainable and inclusive economic growth in Vietnam while achieve competitive risk-adjusted financial return." This GP/LP structured, Cayman Islands-domiciled funds aims to raise US$100 million.

VEH invested in listed companies on the Ho Chi Minh City Stock Exchange and Hanoi Stock Exchange, over-the-counter (OTC), private companies/development projects and/or debt securities.

SAM assisted its portfolio companies in pursuing international standards by taking board positions to influence corporate governance and transparency. It previously held board positions at two listed real estate development companies in Vietnam, Century 21 (C21) and Nam Bay Bay (NBB).

In 2014, VEH was ranked in the Top 3 for best investment performance in Vietnam by Edmond de Rothschild.

In November 2016, Hong Kong-based Sunwah Group announced that it formed an advisory service joint venture with SAM.
