= St. John's Church, Stuttgart =

Church in Stuttgart, Germany

Coordinates: 48°46′24″N 9°09′53″E

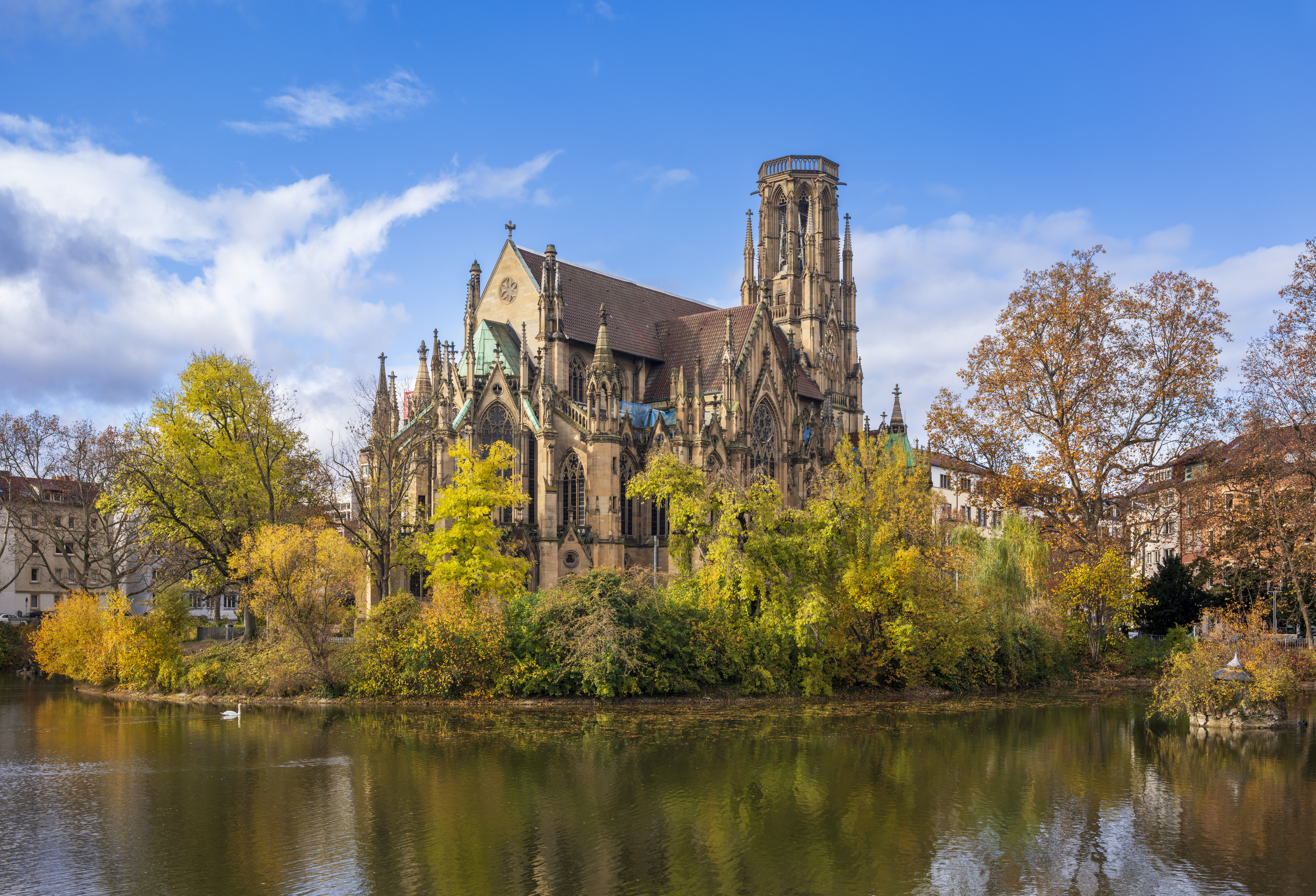
St John's Church on the Feuersee

The Protestant Church of St John (German: Johanneskirche) in Stuttgart was built in the Gothic Revival style from 1864 to 1876 by its chief architect, Christian Friedrich von Leins. It lies on a peninsula of the Feuersee (Fire Lake), while the main entrance and tower marks the beginning of the former Johannesstraße (St. John's Street).

After being nearly destroyed in the Second World War, the main church building was reconstructed, but the Gothic vaults were replaced with a modern flat ceiling and the tower was intentionally left incomplete to serve as a sort of war memorial.

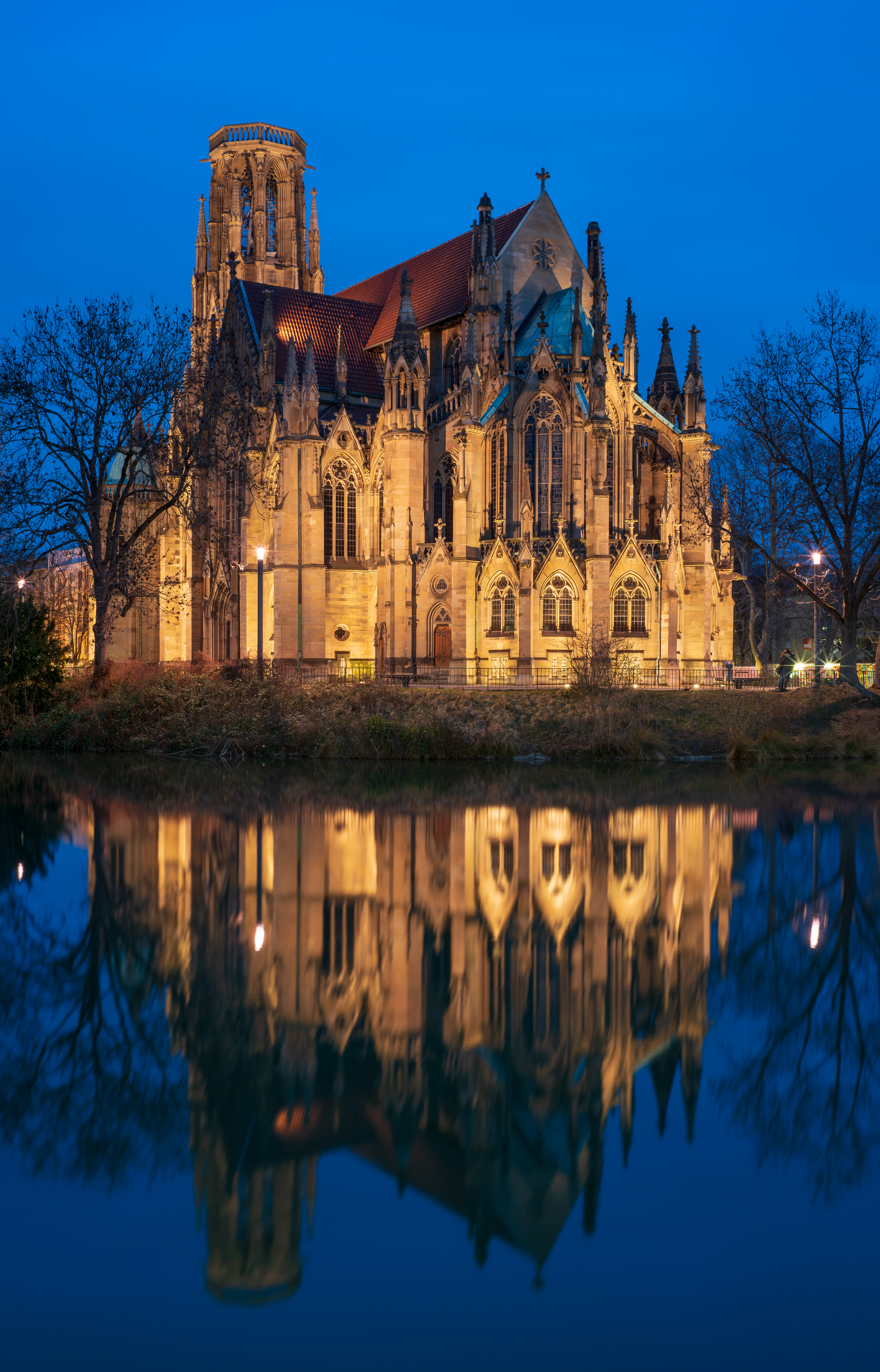
St John's at blue hour

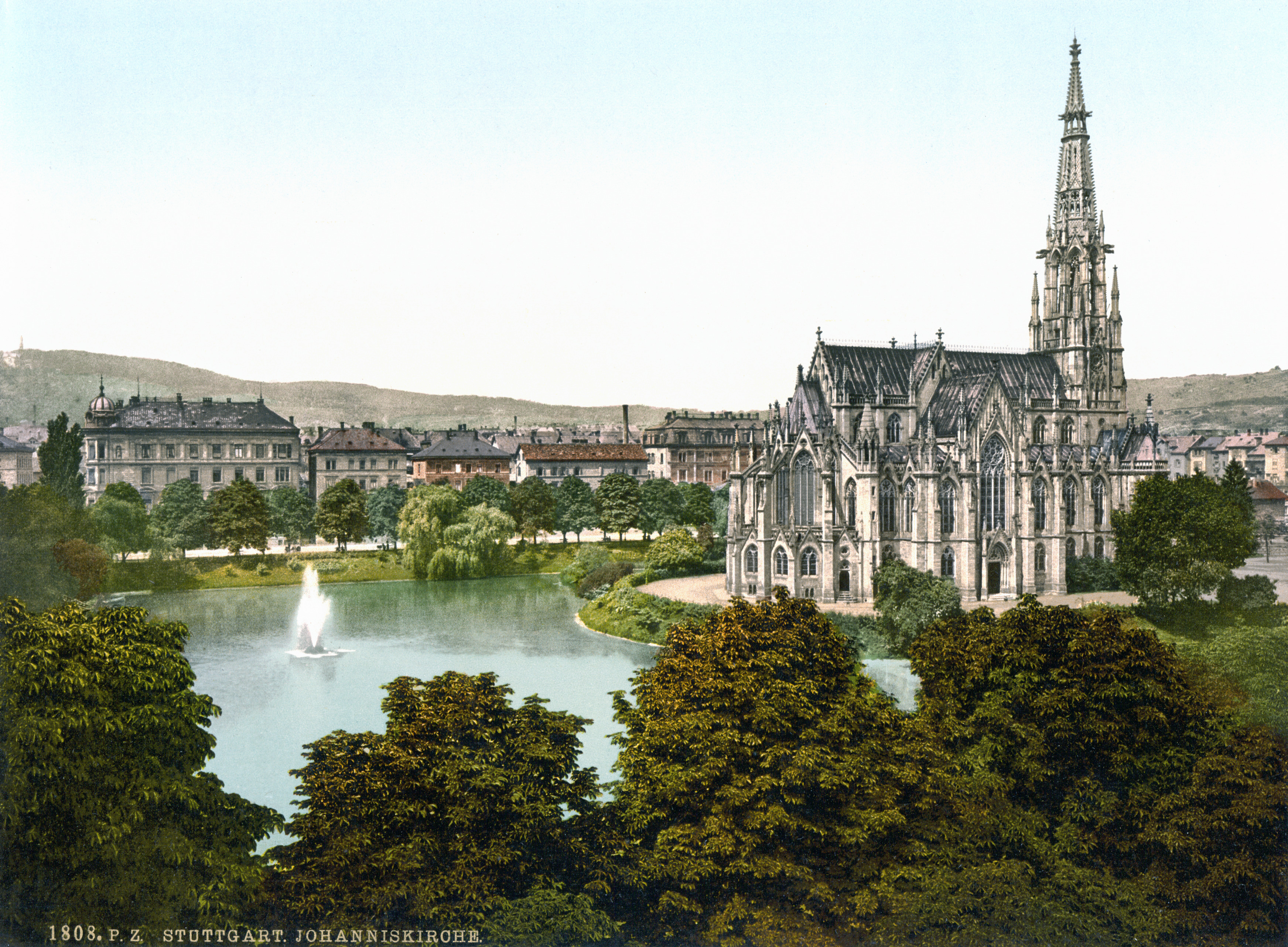
St John's in 1900
