= BX Swiss =

Swiss stock exchange

Coordinates: 46.949749°N 7.442197°E

- Type: Stock Exchange
- Location: Bern and Zurich, Switzerland
- Founded: 1880
- Owner: Börse Stuttgart
- Key people: Harald Schnabel (CEO)
- Currency: CHF
- Website: www.bxswiss.com

BX Swiss (formerly Berne eXchange, abbreviated: BX) is a Swiss stock exchange operated by BX Swiss AG (formerly Berner Börsenverein). It has its main office in Zurich and is subject to supervision by the Swiss Financial Market Supervisory Authority (FINMA).

== History and membership ==
The original Berne Exchange emerged from the Berne Bank Association, which was founded on 28 January 1880 by nine banks and 14 private companies. On November 10, 1884, the Berne Stock Exchange Association was founded. Until the First World War, the development of the stock exchange was very modest. Between 1911 and 1913, 1100 transactions were concluded annually.

From 1961 to 1991, open outcry trading was conducted in the basement of Aarbergergasse 30 in Bern. Due to a lack of volume, the company switched to telephone trading in 1991.

In contrast to the Zurich, Basel and Geneva stock exchanges, the Berne Stock Exchange did not participate in the 1995 merger to form the SIX Swiss Exchange.

Until 2014, BX was a private association under Swiss law, of which all major banks in Berne are members. In connection with the conversion into an AG, the board of directors was also strengthened. The current members Peter L. Heller, Brian Sparks and Claudio Studer were re-elected for a term of three years. At that time, Raffaele Agnetti, UBS, and Peter Kilchenmann, Credit Suisse, were newly elected to the Board. In 2016, the move of the stock exchange to Zurich was announced.

While the operational business is conducted in Zurich, the legal domicile of BX Swiss AG remains in Berne. At the end of 2017, the sale of BX Swiss to Boerse Stuttgart was announced and the re-approval of BX as a fully regulated Swiss stock exchange by FINMA was confirmed. The acquisition was completed in 2018. Since then, BX Swiss has been a 100% subsidiary of Boerse Stuttgart GmbH. CEO is Harald Schnabel, who previously built up the Euwax business of Boerse Stuttgart.

== Regulatory status and legal basis ==
BX Swiss is subject to the Swiss Financial Market Infrastructure Act under supervision by the Swiss Financial Market Supervisory Authority (FINMA).

In addition, listing on the BX Swiss requires compliance with a number of regulatory obligations. The regulatory framework of BX Swiss includes the Listing Rules, various directives and supplementing decisions by the Admission Board. The requirements for listed companies include minimum share capital, publication of audited financial statements in accordance with the applicable accounting standard, disclosure of shareholdings and management transactions and a minimum free float of 15 percent.

== Exchange segments and listed companies ==
BX Swiss maintains various exchange segments. In the equities segment, it is primarily aimed at Swiss SMEs for whom a listing on the SIX Swiss Exchange would be one step too large or too expensive. Currently, 20 companies are listed in the Swisscaps segment. In addition, the BX offers a broad selection of shares admitted to trading (over 3,600 instruments) and ETFs (over 100 listed and 500 instruments admitted to trading). Moreover, in 2018, BX Swiss started a new segment for Actively Managed Certificates (AMC) and announced its new segment deriBX to offer an attractive exchange segment for the trading of structured products and warrants in early 2019.

Companies listed on the BX Swiss include, among others:

- Admicasa Holding Ltd.
- Athris AG
- Aventron AG
- BV Holding AG
- Sandpiper Digital AG
- SenioResidenz AG
