= Königsbau =

Building of the Stuttgart Schlossplatz

48.7790°N 9.782°E

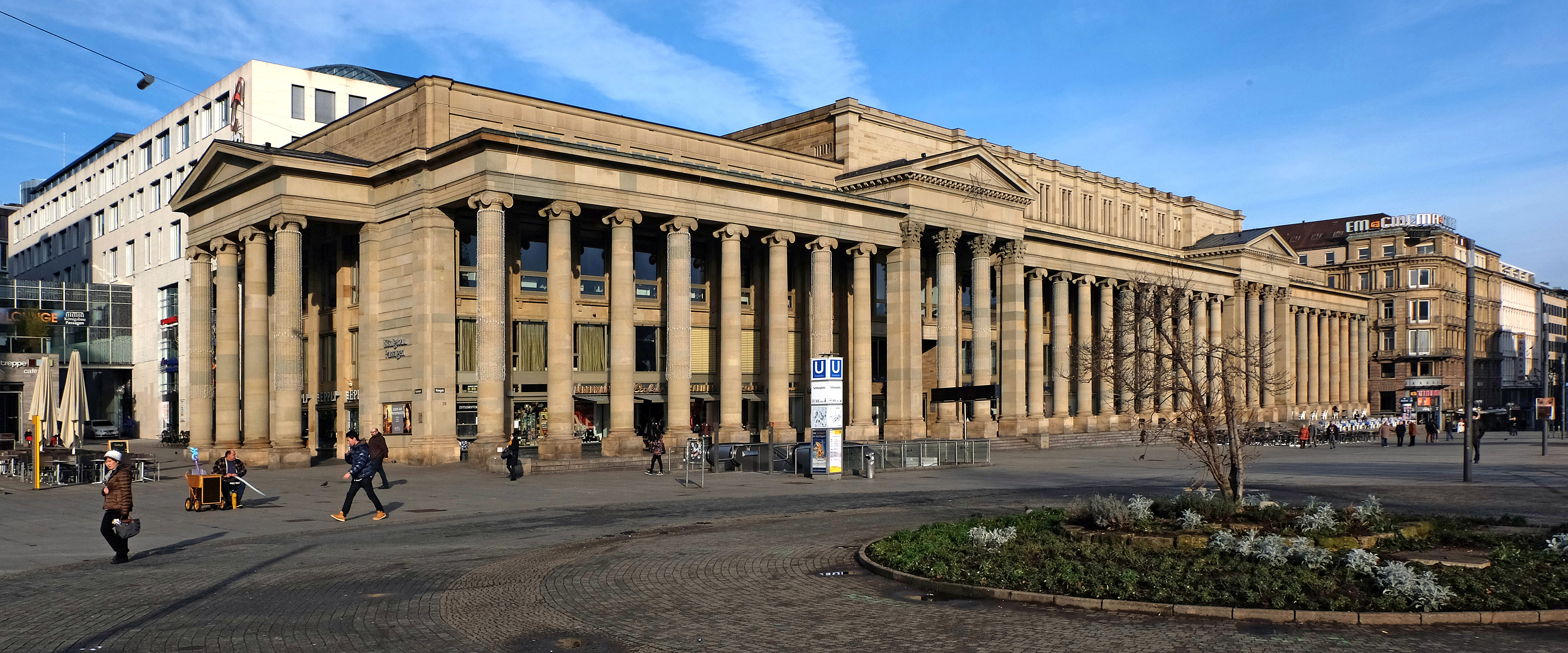
Königsbau from near

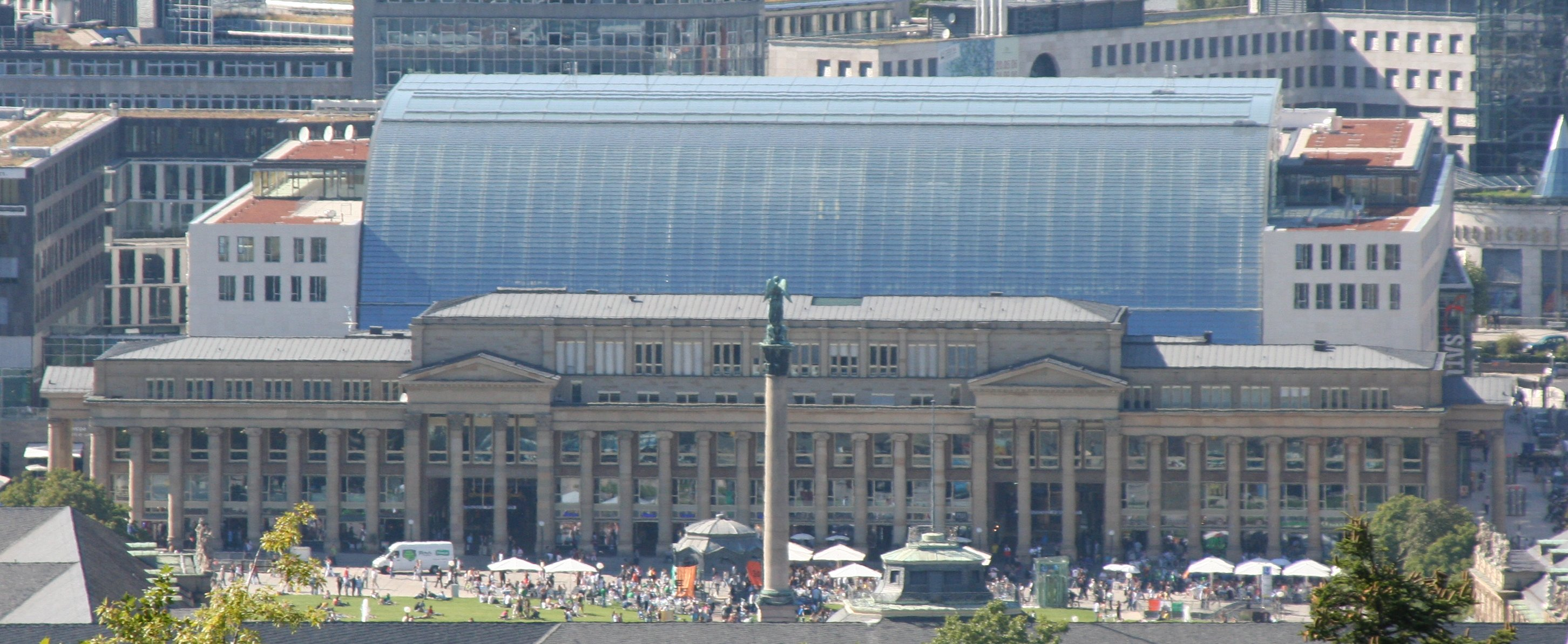
Königsbau from far

The Königsbau is one of the formative buildings of Stuttgart's Schlossplatz. It forms the north-west end of the square and is mainly home to shops and cafés. Since April 2006, the Königsbau-Passagen, a 45,000 square meter retail and commercial building, has been attached to the rear of the Königsbau.

== History ==
The Königsbau was built between 1856 and 1860 by order of King Wilhelm I in late classicist style as a business, concert and ball house. The royal court architect Christian Friedrich von Leins together with architect Johann Michael Knapp were awarded the building contract. After Knapp retired from work in 1857, partly for health reasons, Leins completed the construction. The official inauguration took place in September 1860. Two years earlier, Wilhelm I had already given permission for the project to be called the Königsbau. The monumental building was intended to form a counterpoint to the New Palace and is characterized by a colonnade consisting of 34 columns, 135 meters long. Inside, there were already at that time restaurants and large rooms used for various celebrations and events.

During World War II, the Königsbau was severely damaged, and in 1958 and 1959 it was rebuilt at a cost of the equivalent of €4 million. From 1991 to 2002, the Königsbau housed the Stuttgart Stock Exchange, which has since moved to Börsenstraße.

== Literature ==
- Uwe Bogen (text); Thomas Wagner (photos): Stuttgart. Eine Stadt verändert ihr Gesicht. Erfurt 2012, p. 10–11.
- Der Königsbau. In: Eugen Dolmetsch: Aus Stuttgarts vergangenen Tagen (second volume from „Bilder aus Alt-Stuttgart“). Selbsterlebtes und Nacherzähltes. Stuttgart 1931, p. 66–69.
- Königsbau Passagen. Unter Dach und Fach. In: Stuttgart baut. Entwicklungen und neue Bauprojekte 4. 2006, p. 46–49.
- Hermann Lenz; Günter Beysiegel (Herausgeber): Stuttgart. aus 12 Jahren Stuttgarter Leben. Stuttgart: Belser, 1983, p. 416–420.
- Michael Wenger, Königsbau. In: Stadtarchiv Stuttgart: Digitales Stadtlexikon, published on August 24, 2020.
