= Christian Friedrich von Leins =

German architect

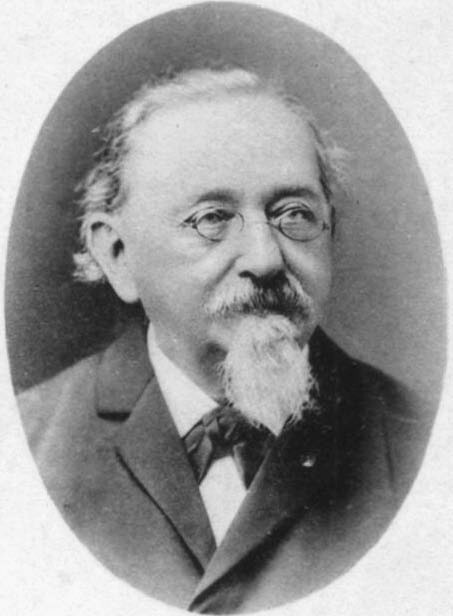
Christian Friedrich von Leins

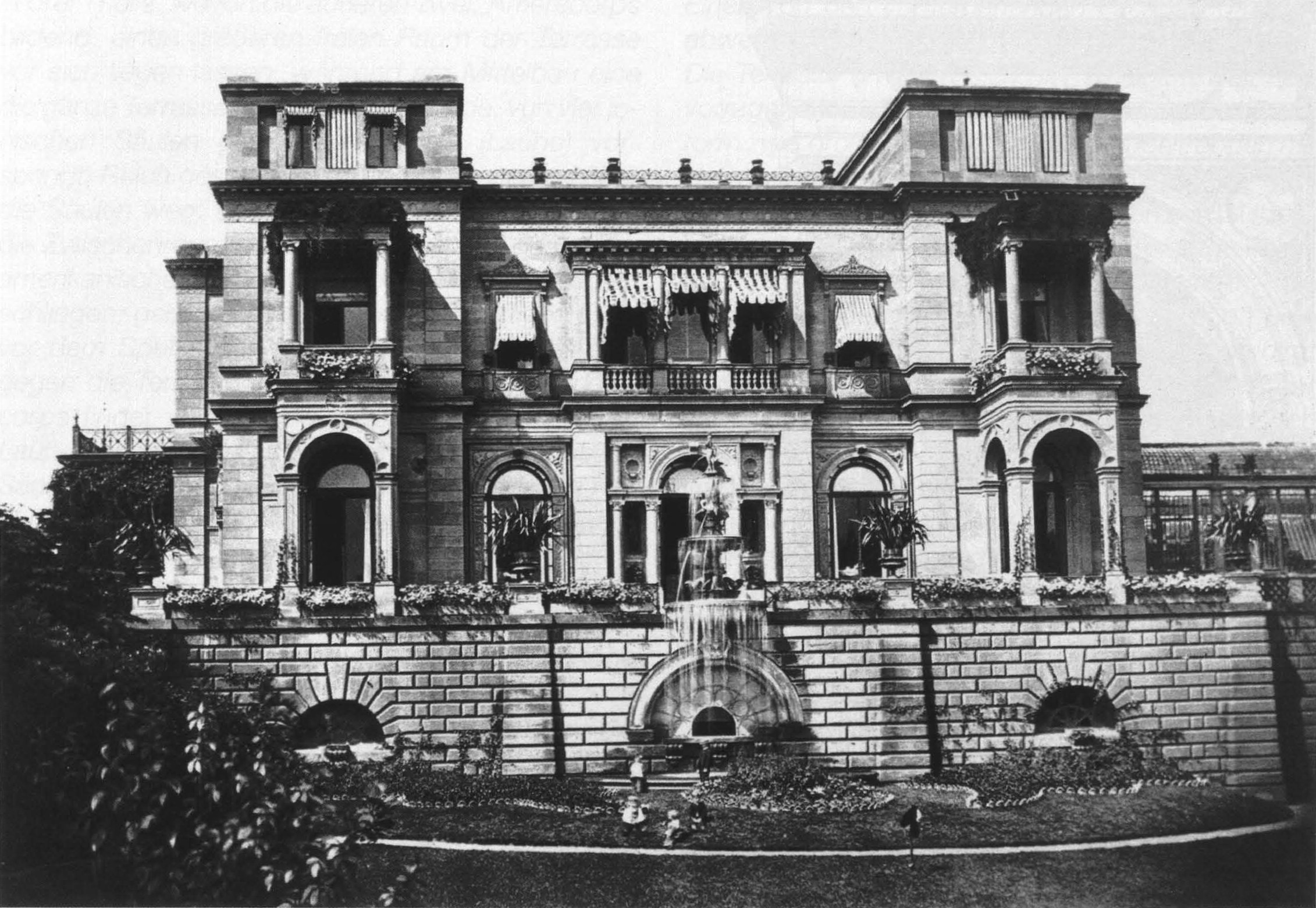
The Villa Berg, east façade (c. 1870)

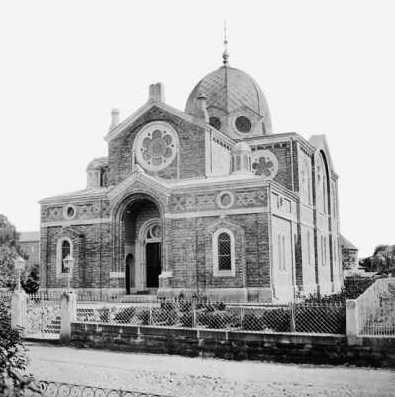
The Göppingen Synagogue (1881)

Christian Friedrich von Leins (22 November 1814 in Stuttgart – 25 August 1892 in Stuttgart) was a German architect.

== Life ==
He was the son of masonry foreman. Until 1837, Leins attended the Friedrich-Eugens-Gymnasium in Stuttgart, then served an apprenticeship at a local architectural firm. From 1837 to 1840, he lived in Paris, where he found employment with Henri Labrouste, while he received training from Eugène Flachat and Jules Petiet. Upon returning home, he passed the state exam for structural engineering.

He made trips to Bavaria and Austria in 1843, to study the Medieval and Renaissance architecture there. His work on a new building for the Russian Legation impressed the Crown Prince, so Leins was contracted to design the "Villa Berg", a new royal residence. In 1846, he accompanied the Prince's entourage to Palermo, seeking inspiration from the structures there. In 1853, he undertook another study trip to Italy, Spain and North Africa with Friedrich Wilhelm Hackländer and Theodor Horschelt.

In 1858, he became a professor at the Technical University (now part of the University of Stuttgart). From 1870 to 1872 and again from 1878 to 1880, he was the head of the managing committee and served as a member of the first permanent Governing Board from 1881 until his death. Over his career, he was involved in the construction, restoration or expansion of over 100 Protestant churches

In 1872, he was awarded the Knight's Cross, First Class of the Order of the Crown (Württemberg), which conferred a title of nobility. His personal papers and original drawings are preserved in the Stuttgart University Library.

== Major projects ==
- 1845–1853: "Villa Berg" (Summer Home of the Crown Prince Karl and his wife, Olga)
- 1857–1859: "Königsbau" (Festival hall and bazaar) in Stuttgart, Schlossplatz (together with Johann Michael Knapp)
- 1865: Evangelical Petruskirche in Wurmberg
- 1865–1876: Johanneskirche in Stuttgart by the Feuersee (severely damaged in World War II and partially restored)
- 1875: "Liederhalle" in Stuttgart (destroyed in World War II)
- 1876–1877: Church in Saulgau
- 1879: Göppingen Synagogue (destroyed in 1938)
- 1879–1883: Evangelical Stadtkirche in Weingarten (Württemberg)
- 1884–1886: Martinskirche in Ohmenhausen (Reutlingen)
- 1884–1886: Evangelical Kirche-St.Gallus in Böhringen (Römerstein)
