= Johann Friedrich Dieterich =

German painter and art professor (1787–1846)

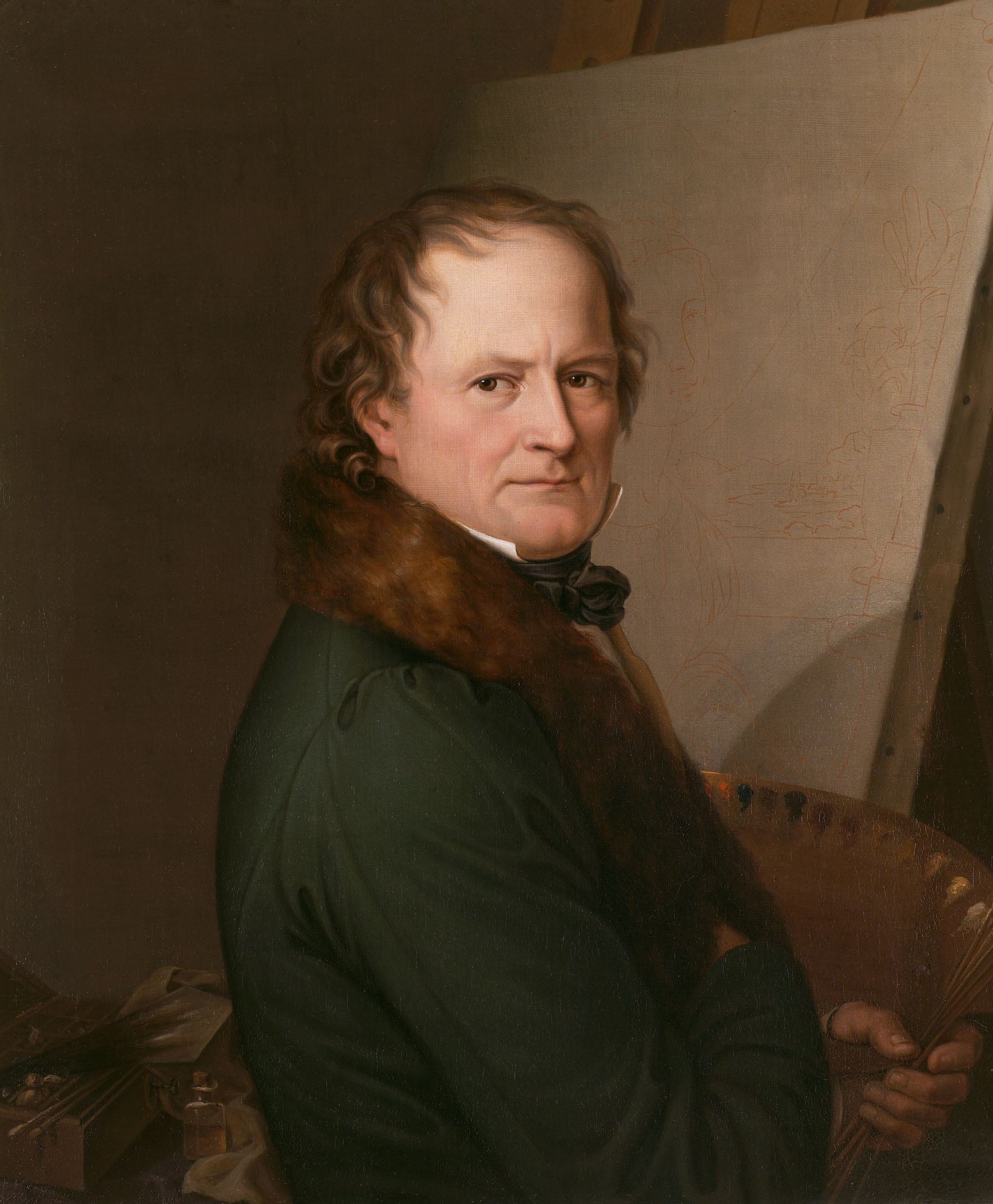
Self-portrait with Easel (1835)

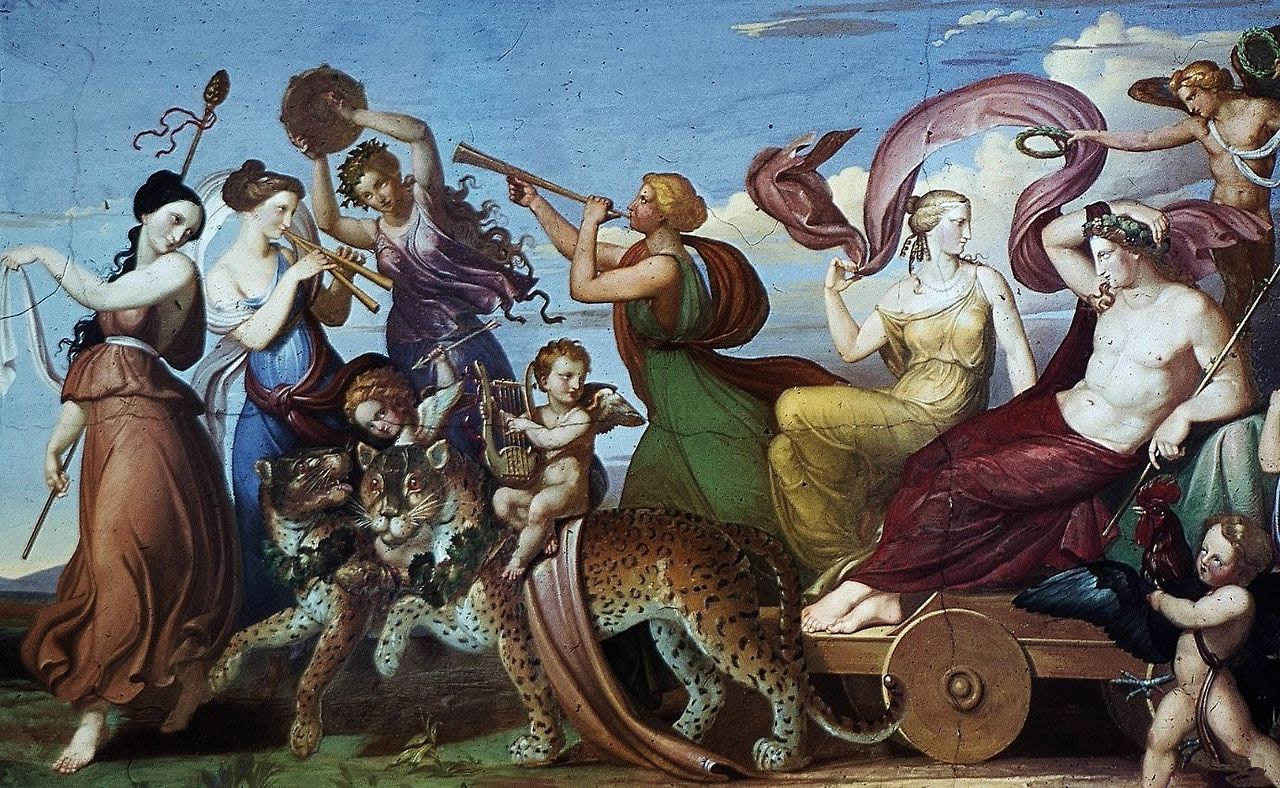
The Triumph of Bacchus

Johann Friedrich Dieterich (21 September 1787, Biberach an der Riß - 17 January 1846, Stuttgart) was a German painter and art professor.

== Biography ==
He was born into the family of a poor manual laborer. His artistic talent first revealed itself in the paintings he made on the fruit sacks his father carried. He was eventually able to reach Stuttgart, where received his training from the court painter and gallery director, Johann Baptist Seele, and the theatrical painter, Carl Heideloff, who became his sponsor.

Deciding that he wanted to do more than paint stages, he went to Munich in 1811, followed by a short trip to Italy. He brought back some works he made there, to demonstrate his talent, and was able to receive a grant to return to Italy in 1818. There, he associated with other German artists; most of whom were members of the Nazarene movement.

Returning to Germany in 1822, he received a commission from King William I of Württemberg to paint draft sketches of reliefs on canvas, which were later sculpted at Rosenstein Palace. He was there again from 1826 to 1828, painting scenes from the Bacchus myth on the dining room ceiling, and designs for the Royal children. Although these were the works that brought him recognition, he felt that they were not sufficiently serious for his true artistic nature.

Around 1829, he became the primary teacher of history painting at the newly established State Academy of Fine Arts Stuttgart. He was appointed a Professor in 1833, and served until his death. During those years, he devoted himself entirely to portraits and religious art. Most of the latter showed the distinct influence of Raphael and declined in quality over the years.
