= Rosenstein Palace =

Rosenstein Castle
- Schloss Rosenstein
- Baden-Württemberg's Coat of Arms

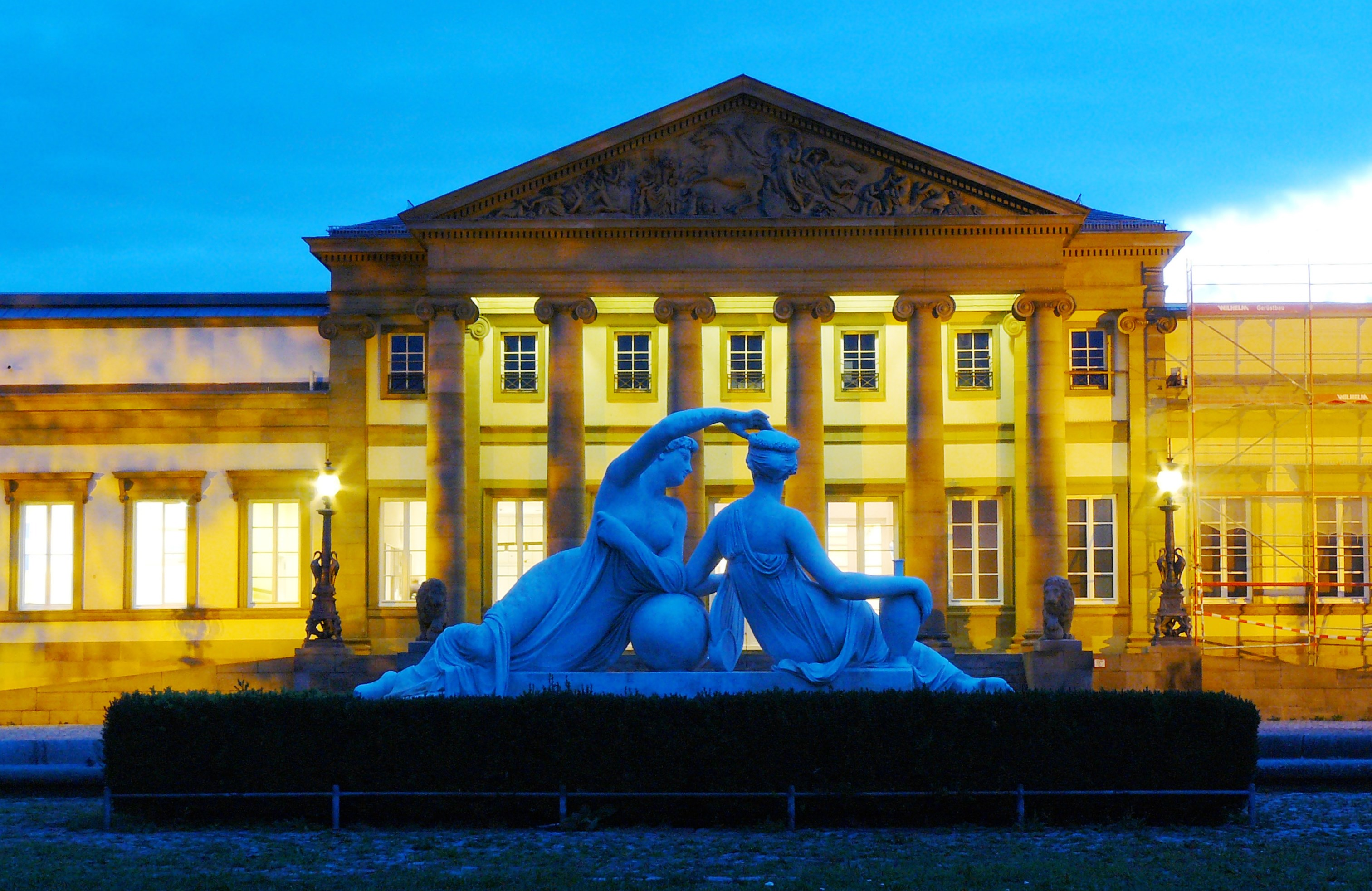
- View at Night

- Location within Baden-Württemberg Location within Germany
- Former names: Die Kahlenstein (German: The Bald Rock)
- Etymology: Die Rosenstein (German: The Rose Rock), for the rock it sits upon.

General information
- Status: Completed
- Type: Palace
- Architectural style: Classical
- Location: Rosenstein Park, Stuttgart, Germany
- Coordinates: 48°48′3.6″N 9°12′21.6″E
- Elevation: 245 m (804 ft)
- Named for: Rose garden on the palace grounds
- Groundbreaking: 1824
- Construction started: 1824
- Completed: 1829
- Renovated: 1950–1960 1990–1992
- Demolished: 1944
- Client: State Museum of Natural History Stuttgart
- Owner: State Museum of Natural History Stuttgart

Dimensions
- Diameter: 75 m × 47 m (246 ft × 154 ft)

Technical details
- Floor area: 3,235 m^{2} (34,820 sq ft)

Design and construction
- Architect: Giovanni Salucci

Rosenstein Castle (German: Schloss Rosenstein) is a palace in Stuttgart, Germany. It was designed in the classical style by the architect and court builder Giovanni Salucci (1769–1845) as the summer palace for King Wilhelm I of Württemberg, and was built between 1822 and 1830.

Today, the building houses that part of the State Museum of Natural History Stuttgart dealing with extant lifeforms.

== Participating artists ==
Artists who participated in the construction and decoration of the palace were as listed below. Key to the abbreviations:

- NLE = No Longer Exists
- RE = Restored
- INT = Intact

=== Sculptors ===
Status of artwork	Artist	Artworks
NLE	Albert Güldenstein	Two deer and two lions cast in bronzed zinc
INT	Albert Güldenstein	Two large candelabras
INT	Albert Güldenstein	Four small candelabra on the ramps
NLE	Albert Güldenstein	Small candelabra: eight in side porticos and eight in loggias
INT	Conrad Weitbrecht	The Four Seasons stucco frieze in the ballroom
INT	Friedrich Distelbarth	Artemis and Selene relief above the main entrance
INT	Johann Michael Knapp	Lions Gate Archway
INT	Johann Wilhelm Braun	Two muses
INT	Ludwig von Hofer	Venus of Phidias and Venus de Milo in the rose garden
INT	Ludwig Mack	Helios-relief on the rear façade
INT	Theodor Wagner	Six Muses, Small gable reliefs, four four garlands Friese, 16 medallions

=== Painters ===
Status	Artist	Artworks
NLE	Johann Friedrich Dieterich	Five ceiling frescoes in the dining room.
NLE	Joseph Anton von Gegenbaur	Fresco in the dome and four frescoes in dome corners in the banquet hall; four frescoes in the Queen's library
NLE	Gottlob Johann Gutekunst	Frescoes of the barrel vault in the ballroom

== Trivia ==
- Before the construction of the palace, the hill Rosenstein Castle stands on was called Kahlenstein (German: Bald Rock) as it was bare of trees. Afterwards, it became known as Rosenstein (German: Rose Rock) because of the rose garden southeast of the palace.
- Directly under Rosenstein Castle is Württemberg's first railroad tunnel. Constructed between July 1844 and July 1846, the tunnel is 326 metres (1,070 ft) long and was used until a new tunnel, located further east and not passing under the castle, was completed in 1915.
