= Elhanan Rosenstein =

German rabbi

Elhanan Rosenstein (אלחנן ראזענשטיין in his Yiddish spelling; 1796–1869), son of the Rabbi Zanvil Rosenstein of Bonn and father of the physician Samuel Siegmund Rosenstein, was a rabbi who served in Berlin from 1846 until 1869. Despite being a writer and having a high position in the German Jewish community, Rosenstein was known in his time as being an inarticulate orator in German.
