= Rosenstein Tunnel =

Tunnels in Baden-Württemberg, Germany

Coordinates: 48.7998°N 9.2063°E

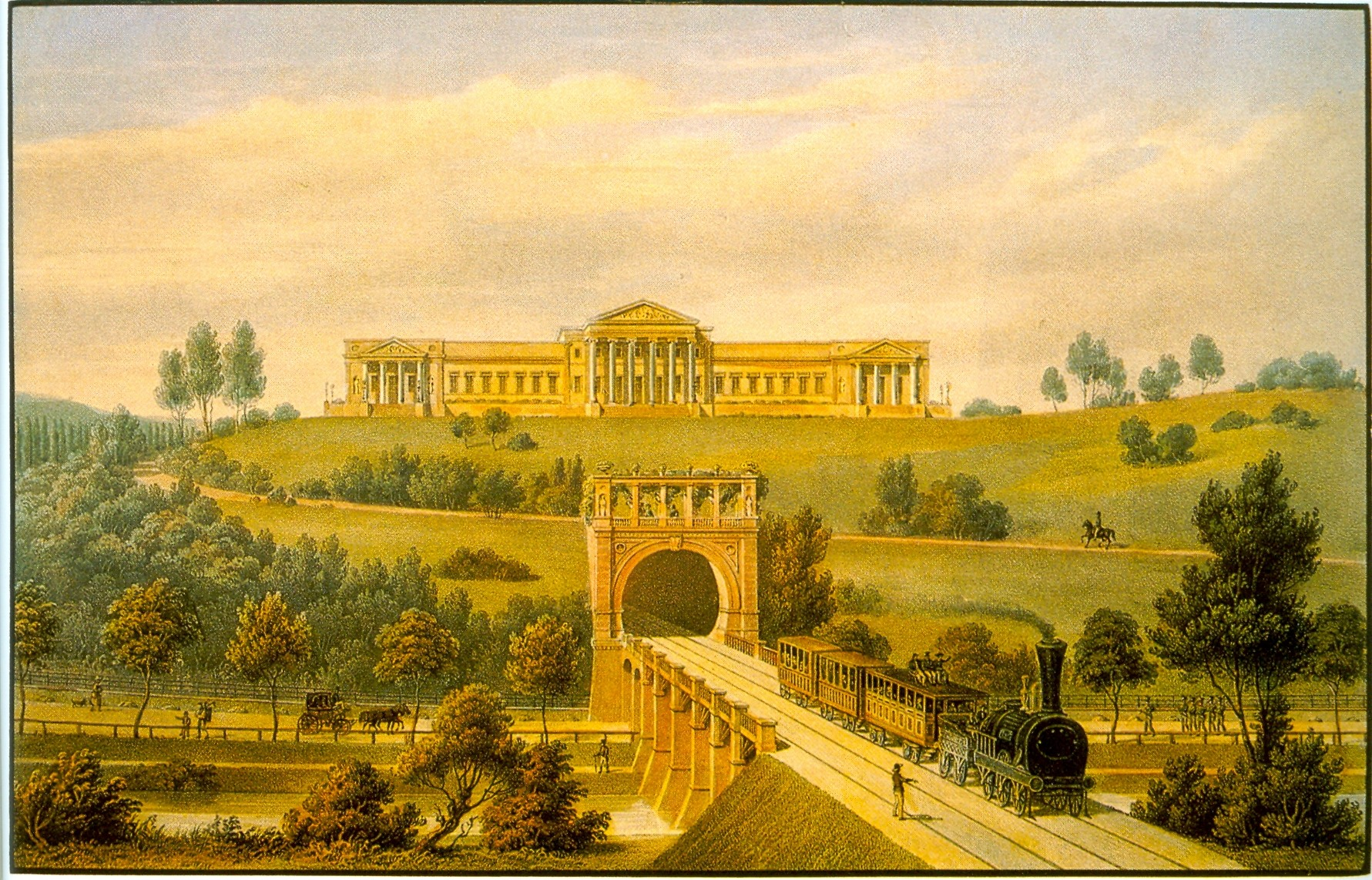
Rosenstein Castle with the first rail tunnel in 1846

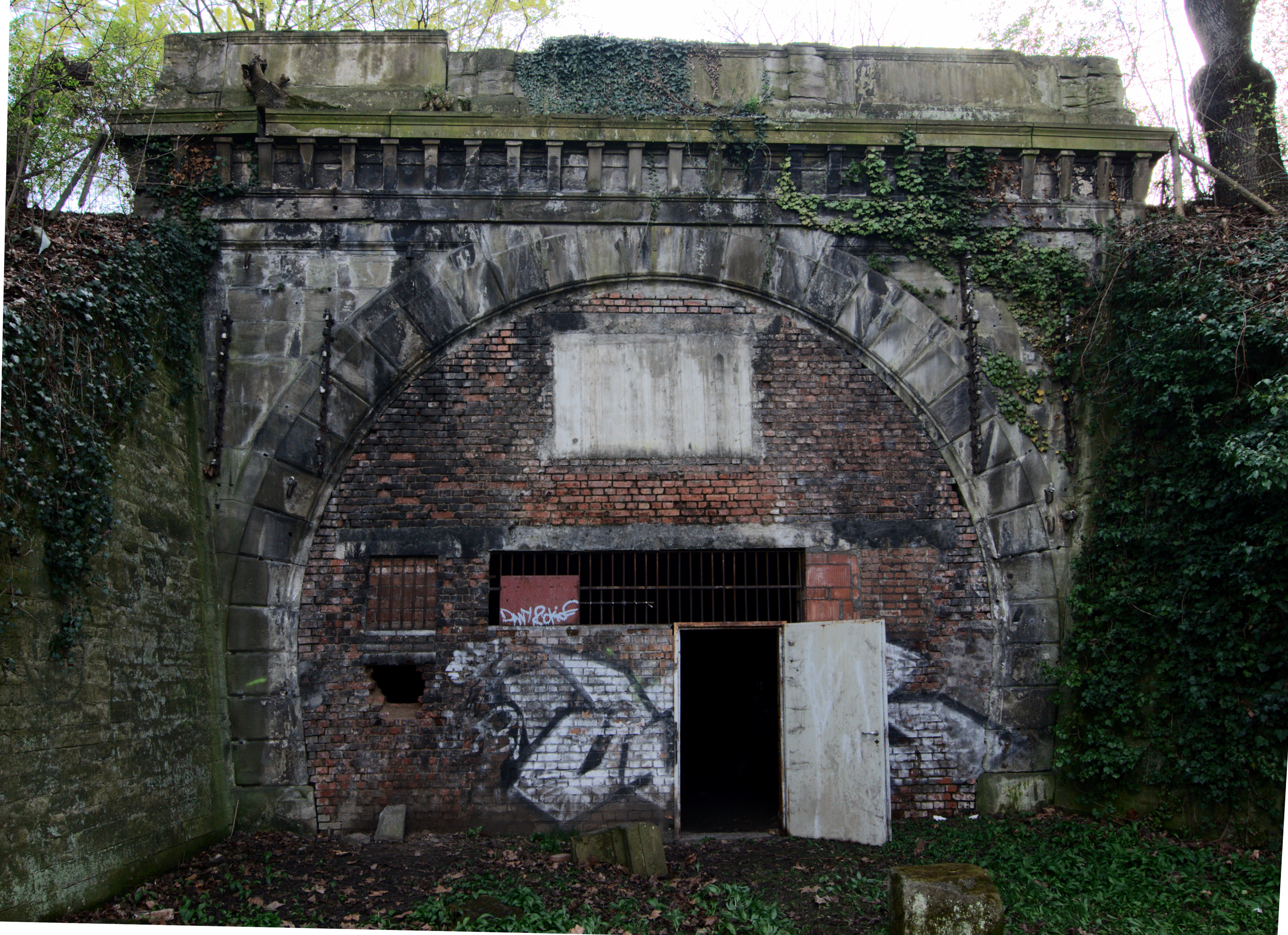
Northern entrance to the old Rosenstein tunnel, April 2011

The Rosenstein tunnel (German: Rosensteintunnel) is the name of several past, present and planned tunnels in the Stuttgart metropolitan area, in the German state of Baden-Württemberg. Today it is a railway tunnel under Rosenstein Park to Bad Cannstatt. It now connects the Fils Valley Railway (Filstalbahn) from Stuttgart Central Station (Hauptbahnhof) to the Rosenstein Bridge over the Neckar to Bad Cannstatt station.

== Rosenstein first tunnel (1844-1915) ==
The first railway tunnel in Württemberg was built during the construction of the Württemberg Central Railway (Zentralbahn) directly under the central axis of Rosenstein Castle. This tunnel was planned by Carl Etzel to link Stuttgart with Cannstatt. In principle, the Rosenstein hill could have been bypassed, but the tunnel allowed a better positioning of Cannstatt station and kept the palace garden (Schlossgarten) from being cut by the railway. Nevertheless, its construction was controversial, as critics feared damage to the castle, but King William I agreed to its construction. The building permit was issued on 14 March 1844.

The tunnel was built using mining methods and construction began on 1 July 1844 and it was completed on 4 July 1846. The completion was delayed by a water and mud intrusion, caused by leaky basins around the castle. The slurry had to be removed from above and then the basins were sealed. This tunnel was 362 metres (1,188 ft) long and was built with double track from the start.

Once operations commenced in the new tunnels in November 1915, the old Rosenstein tunnel was taken out of service in 1916. It was used by three tenants for growing mushrooms from 1931 to 1965. In World War II, it served as an air raid shelter and was rented by Mahle GmbH until 1946. The Bad Cannstatt portal was walled up in 1966 and there are now underground facilities of EnBW inside the portal towards Stuttgart Central Station (Hauptbahnhof).

At the beginning of the 1990s the tunnel was declared to be part of the railway network and not abandoned. In 1992, the tunnel was transferred to the ownership of the state of Baden-Württemberg. It has been considered for the site of a mineral museum. Occasionally, it can be visited today.

== Rosenstein second tunnel (from 1915) ==
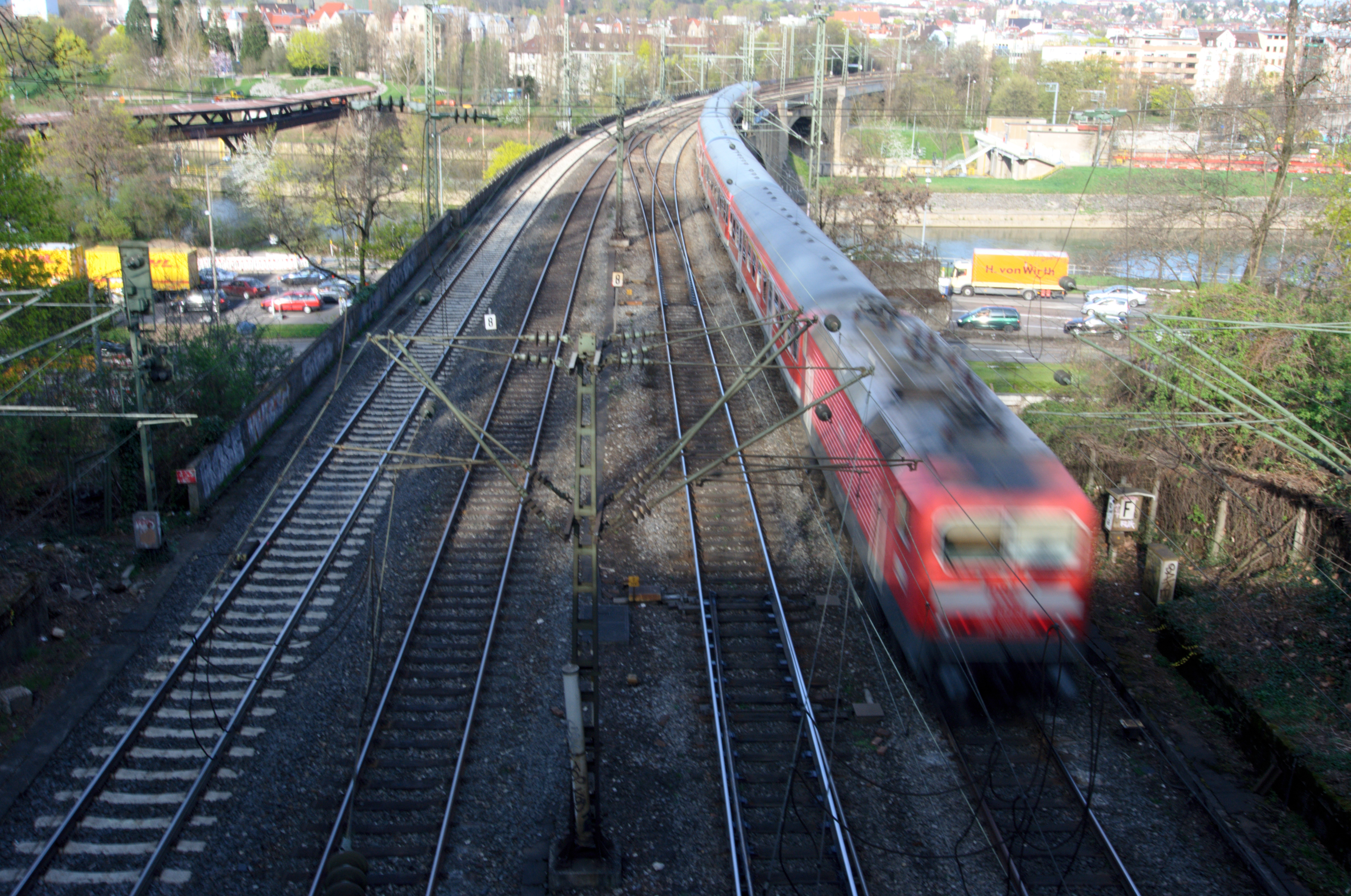
View from the tunnel portal of the new tunnel

When the Stuttgart rail network was reconstructed in the early 20th century, the section between the Central Station and Cannstatt (and beyond) was rebuilt with four tracks. Since the subgrade of Cannstatt station was raised, a new tunnel had to be built. This involved building two twin-track tunnels a little further to the east, which are both 331 metres (1,086 ft) long.

The two new tunnels were built between 1912 and 1914. The first tunnel went into operation in November 1915. The First World War and the lack of money stopped further work on the new railway lines in 1917. The third and fourth tracks from Bad Cannstatt to the Central Station went into operation on 26 May 1925.

== Later developments ==
=== Stuttgart 21 ===
As part of the Stuttgart 21 project another railway tunnel will be built to replace the current Rosenstein tunnel. The preservation of the existing tunnel was examined but rejected in the course of the planning approval process because this would have meant that the railway network would have continued to divide the lower castle garden (Schlossgarten).

The 3.4 km (2.1 mi) long tunnel will run between the new Neckar Bridge and the existing S-Bahn tunnel at the Central Station. The tunnel will initially start as two twin tubes at the Neckar Bridge, one carrying the S-Bahn and one carrying the long-distance tracks. The two tubes will subsequently cross each under Ehmannstraße. After the crossing structure, the two tunnels will each branch into two single-track tubes. A branch from the direction of the Stuttgart North station will connect to the existing infrastructure of the Stuttgart S-Bahn. In the Mittnachtstrasse area a branch structure will be provided where the tracks to and from Stuttgart North merge with the tracks to and from Bad Cannstatt before the tunnel connects with the existing S-Bahn trunk line tunnel at the Central Station.

The tunnel is part of zoning section 1.5 of the Stuttgart 21 project, which was approved on 29 May 2008.

=== B 10 road tunnel ===
A 1,050-metre-long (0.65 mi) road tunnel with two two-lane tubes was built under Rosenstein Park in association with the upgrade of Federal Highway B 10. Stuttgart City Council approved the €193.5 million project on 20 May 2010. The council had approved the development plan for the project in October 2012. Construction was planned to start in 2013 and to be commissioned in 2019. The tunnel was opened in March 2022 at an actual cost of €456 million.

The construction of the road tunnel also involved rebuilding the Berg and Schwanenplatz road tunnels.
