= Rosenstein Park =

Park in Stuttgart, Germany

Coordinates: 48°48′11″N 9°12′00″E

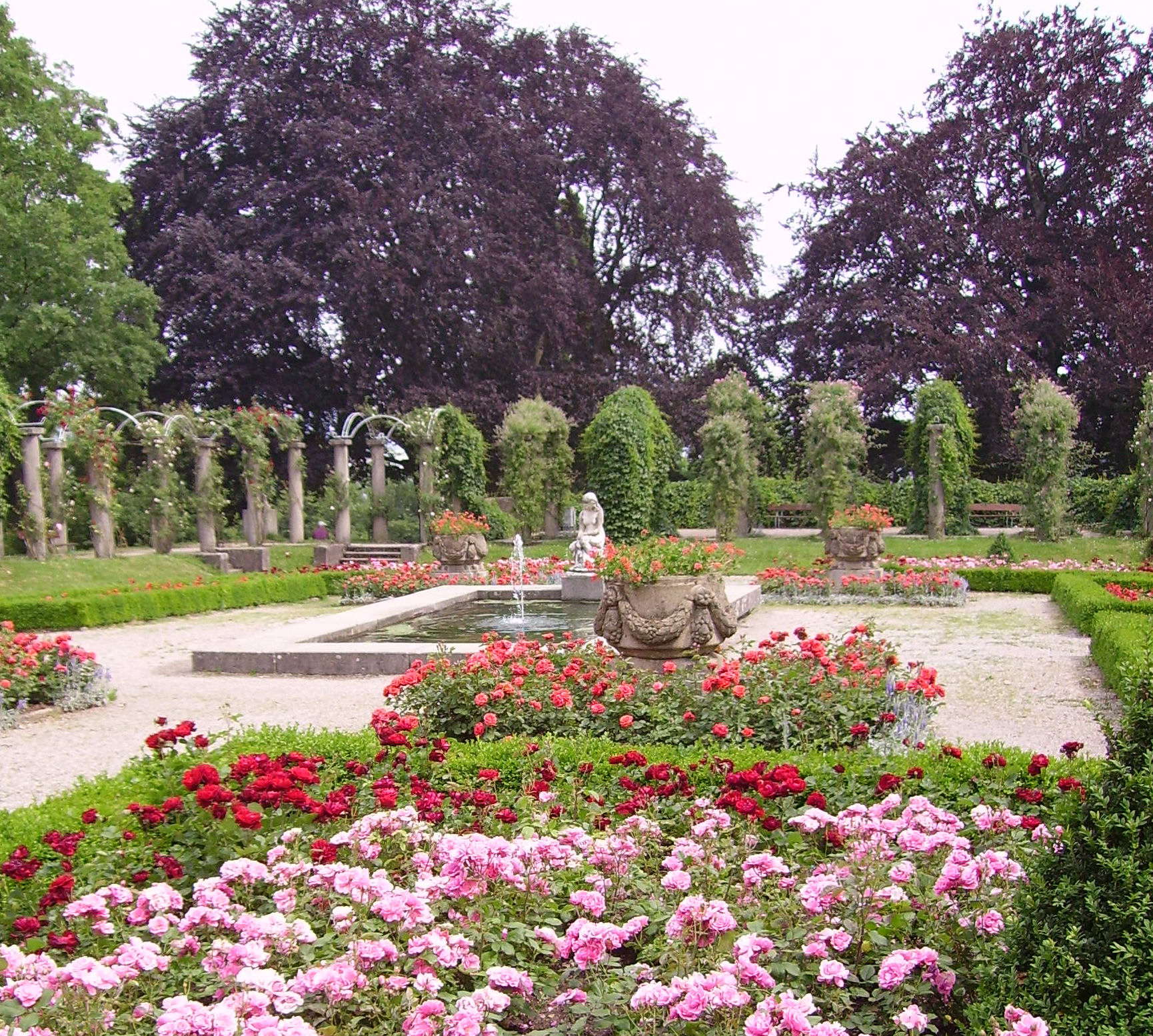
Roses at Rosenstein Palace

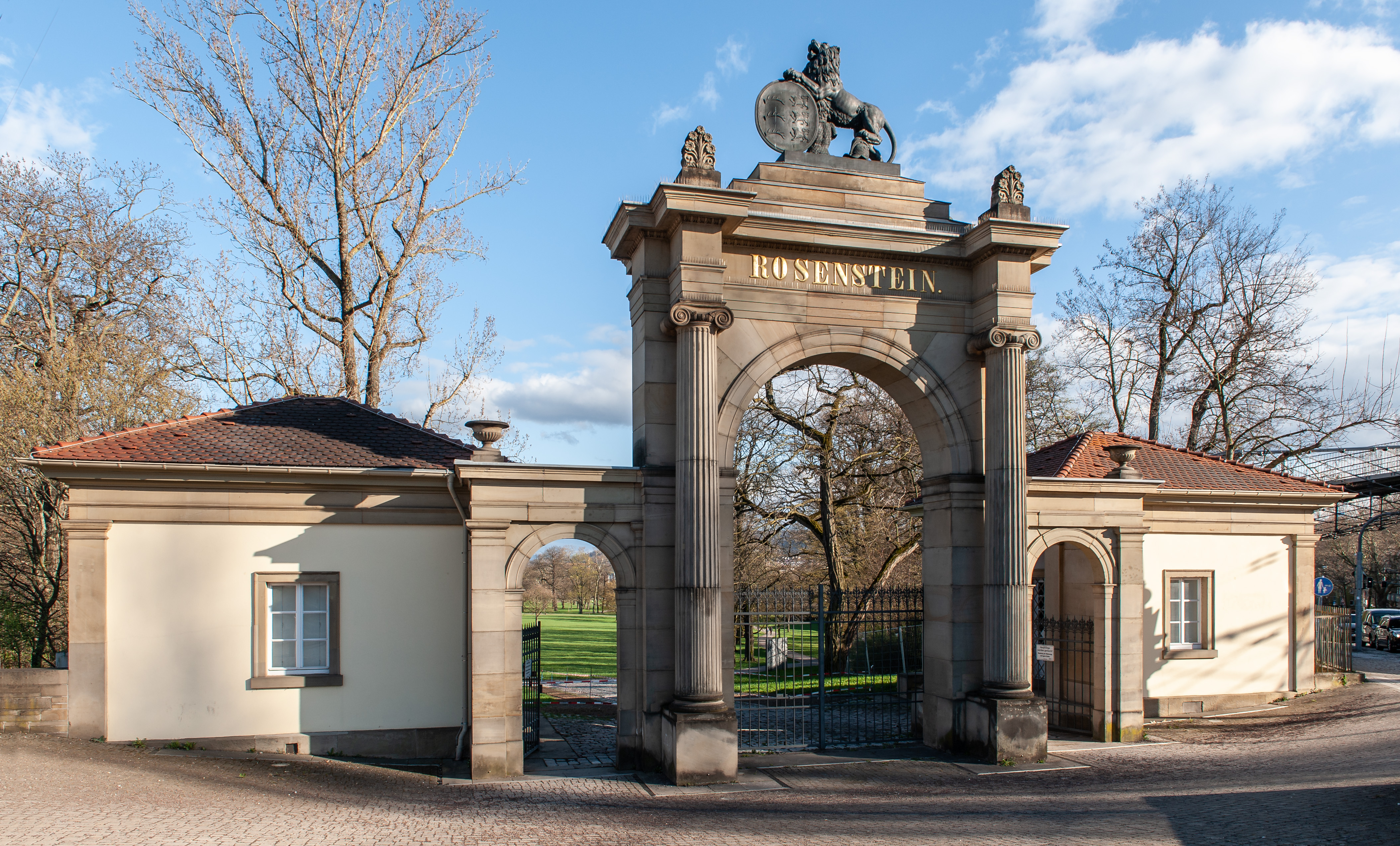
Löwentor (Lion's Gate)

The Rosenstein Park (German: Rosensteinpark) in Stuttgart is the largest English garden in southwest Germany. Its creation took place from 1824 to 1840 on the orders of King William I of Württemberg after plans of his gardener Johann Bosch on the former Kahlenstein area. From 1817 to 1818 King William I had purchased all land on the Kahlenstein from the citizens of Cannstatt.

In the middle of the park the Rosenstein Palace was built from 1822 to 1830. The Wilhelma zoo and the State Museum of Natural History Stuttgart are also located in the park. The Löwentor (Lion's Gate) at the upper park entrance was built by Giovanni Salucci. The Rosenstein Tunnel is a railway tunnel beneath the park.

Today the park is owned by the State of Baden-Württemberg and preserved as a historical monument. In conjunction with the Schlossgarten, the Leibfried Garden, the Wartberg and the Killesbergpark it forms Stuttgart's „Green U“. Because of the ban on hunting within the park it boasts 98.9 hares per 100 ha, the highest concentration of hares in Germany.
