= Johann Michael Knapp =

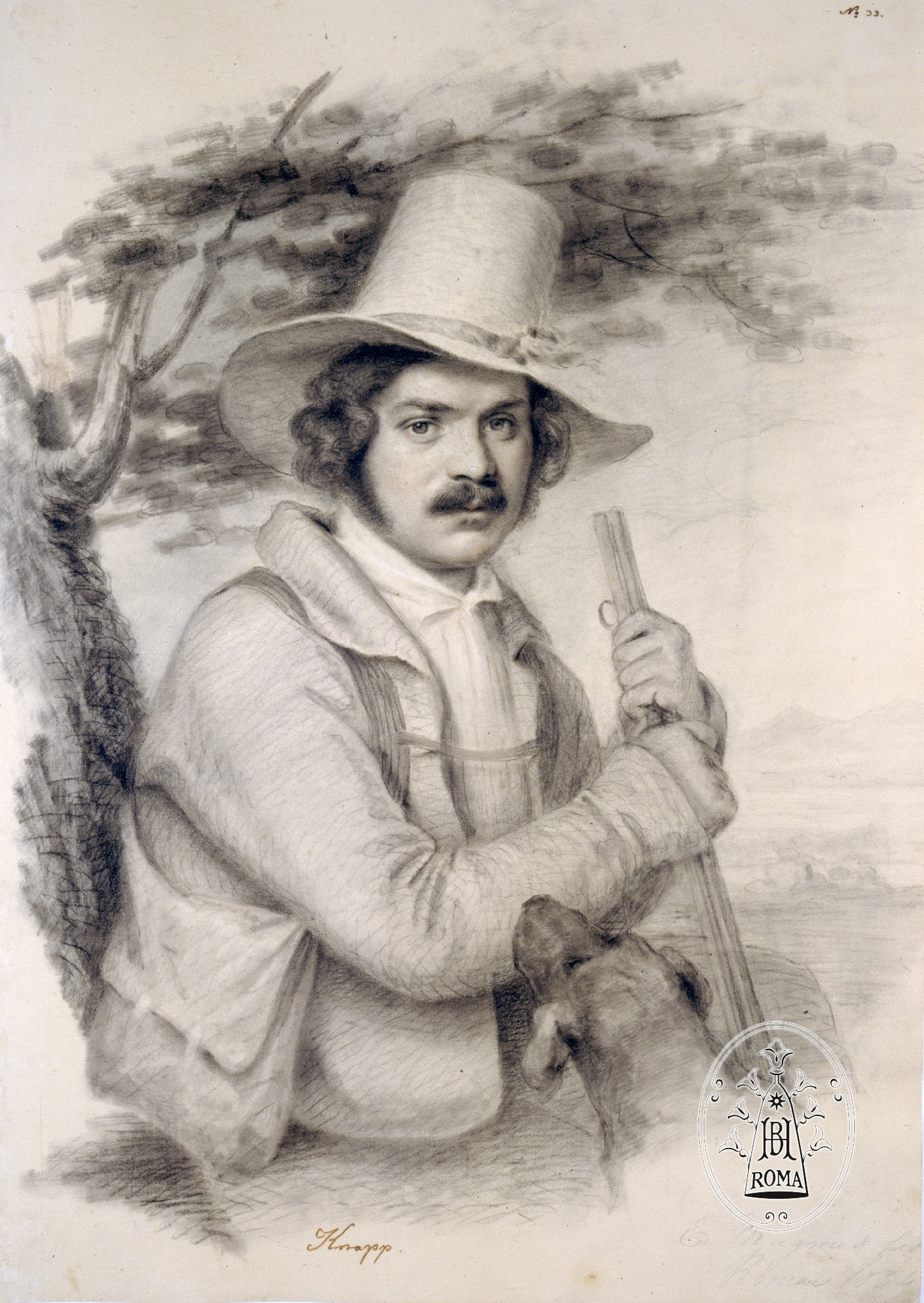
Johann Michael Knapp; by Eduard Magnus (1834)

Johann Michael Knapp (10 March 1791, Stuttgart - 22 October 1861, Stuttgart) was a German court architect in Württemburg.

== Biography ==
His father, also named Johann Michael, originally came from Ditzingen and was a Master baker. His mother, Elisabetha, née Bauder was from Waiblingen. From 1808 to 1809, he attended the Polytechnic School in Karlsruhe ( now part of the Karlsruhe Institute of Technology). After 1815, he pursued his artistic studies with Johann Heinrich von Dannecker. This was followed by an apprenticeship in Milan (1818).

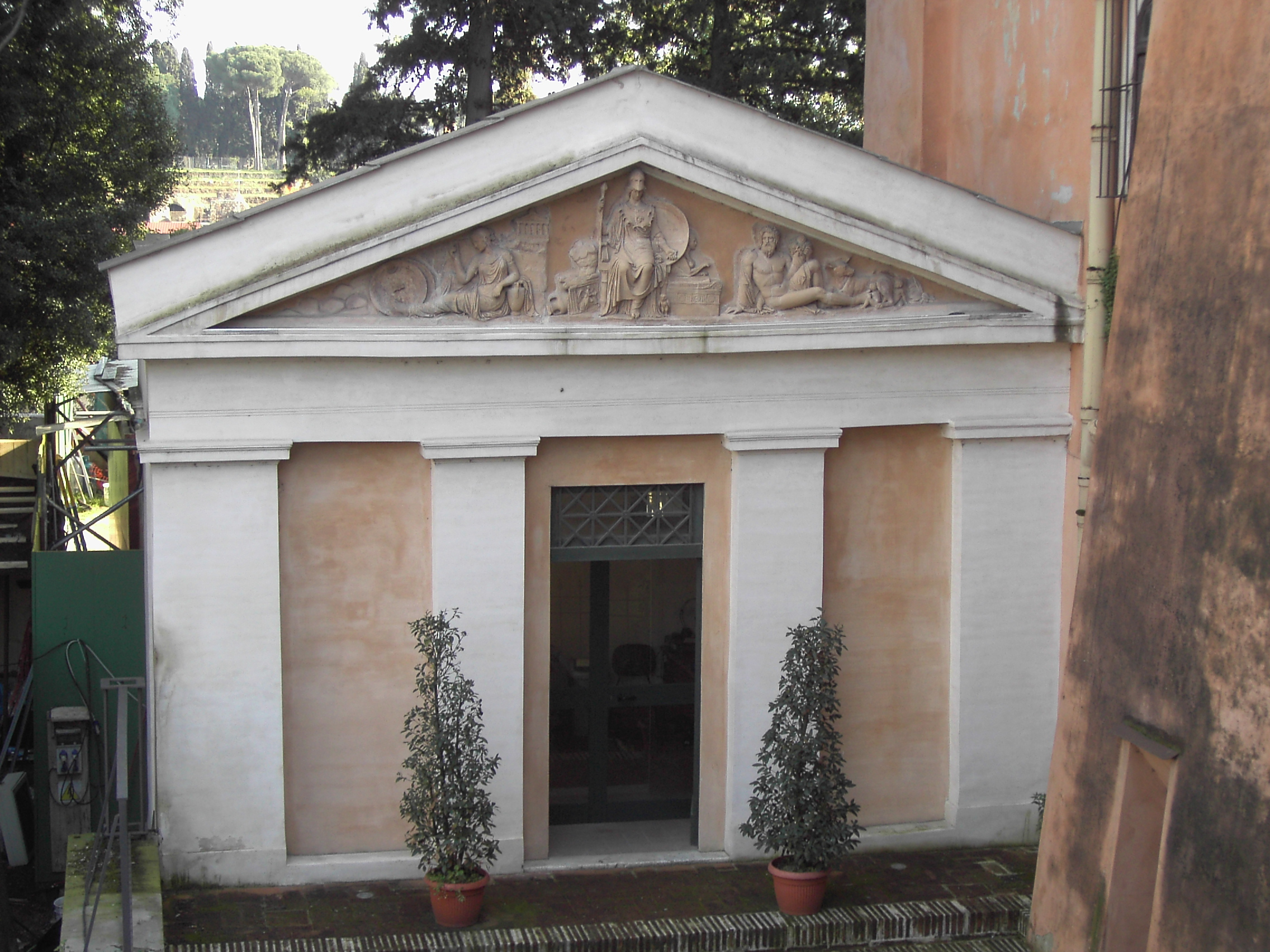
The Casa Tarpeia

He lived in Rome from 1819 to 1840. There, he was a member of the local Deutscher Künstlerverein, also known as the "Ponte Molle Society". He continued to design projects for his hometown. In 1820, together with Giovanni Salucci, he drew the construction plans for the Württemberg Mausoleum; on commission from Queen Katharina Pawlowna.

A trip to Naples in 1821 took him to Pompeii. Later, from 1829 to 1832, he worked on researching and illustrating ancient Etruscan and Hellenistic monuments in Italy and Sicily. He was named a member of the Pontifical Academy of Fine Arts and Letters of the Virtuosi al Pantheon in 1840. That same year, he accepted an appointment as Court Architect in Württemberg and returned home.

In 1843, he and Johann Gottfried Gutensohn published Denkmale der christlichen Religion oder Sammlung der christlichen Kirchen Roms. Rom 1822–27. Auch: Die Basiliken des christlichen Roms. Mit 50 Kupfertafeln (Monuments of the Christian Religion in Rome).

He married Josephine Sofie Haag in 1837. They were divorced in 1849.

== Major works ==
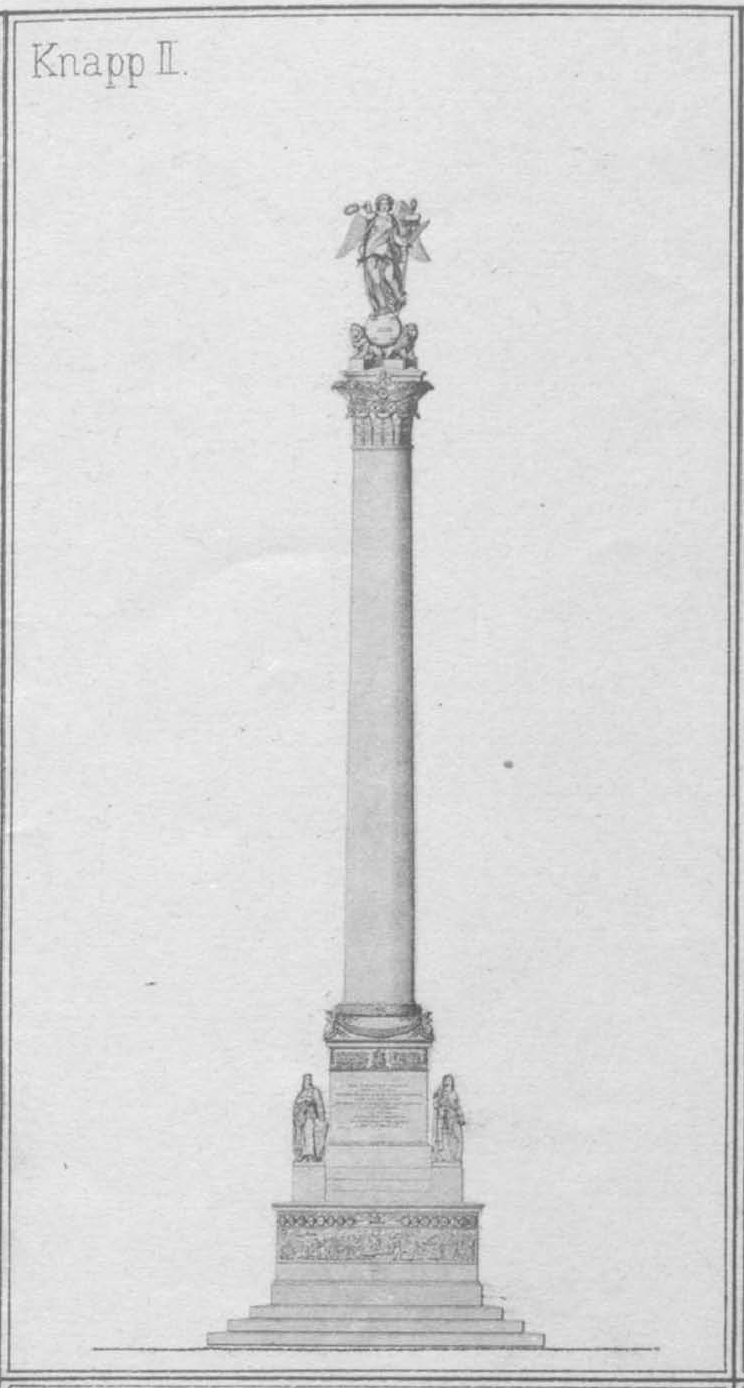
Draft design for the Jubilee Column

- 1835: He designed the Casa Tarpeia on the Capitoline Hill, as the seat of the Deutsches Archäologisches Institut Rom.
- 1841: He drew the first drafts for the Jubiläumssäule (Jubilee Column), for the 25th anniversary of the government of King William I of Württemberg. The final work includes four reliefs by Theodor Wagner, based on his designs.
- 1855-1859: The Late Classical Königsbau, designed together with Christian Friedrich von Leins.
