= Pellinger Berg Tunnel =

Road tunnel in Saarland, Germany

Coordinates: 49.4506°N 6.5132°E

Pellinger Berg Tunnel is a 596-metre road tunnel in Saarland, Germany. It lies along Bundesautobahn 8.
