= Samuel Siegmund Rosenstein =

German physician

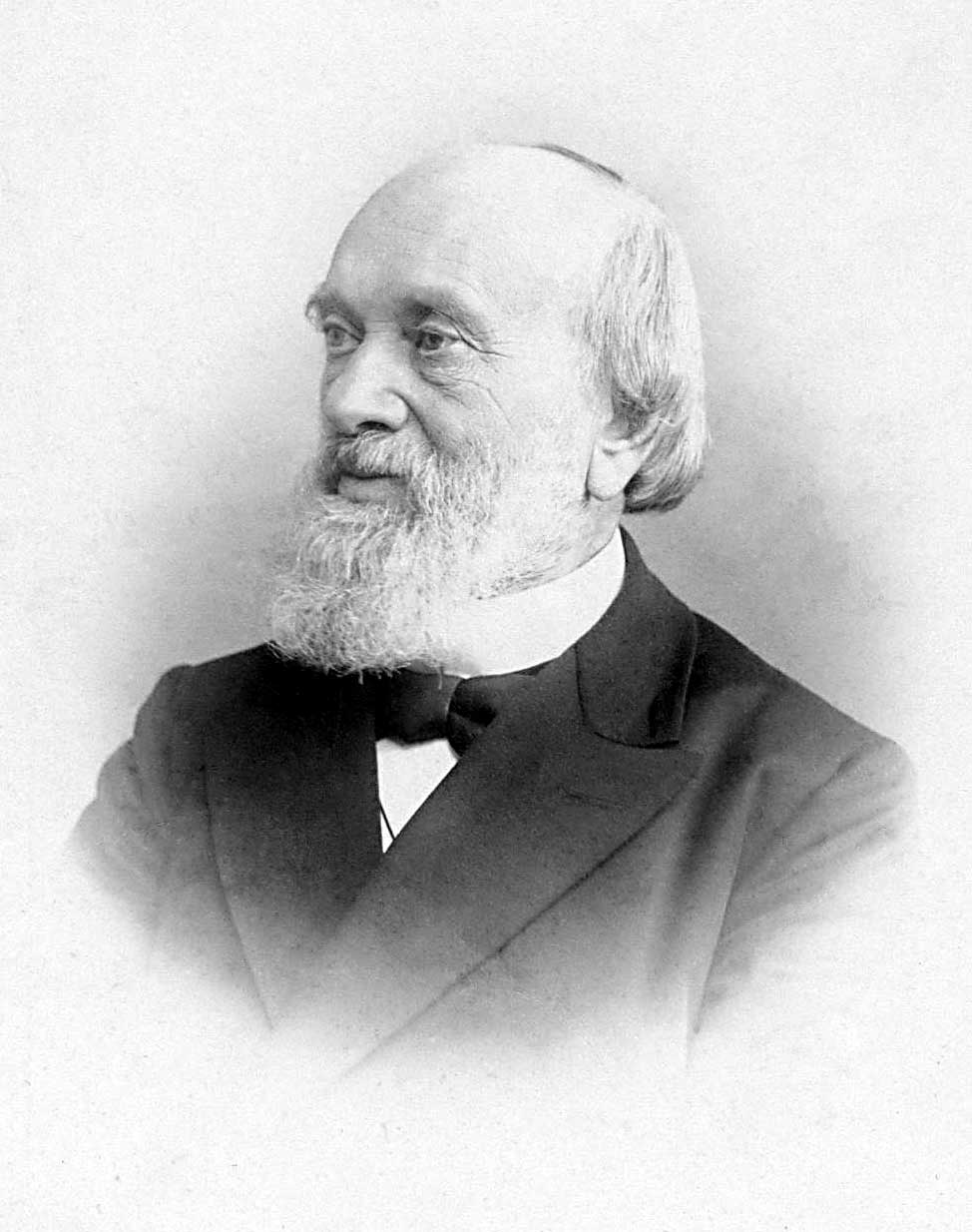
Samuel Siegmund Rosenstein

Samuel Siegmund Rosenstein (20 February 1832 in Berlin – 31 January 1906 in The Hague) was a German physician.

He was the son of Rabbi Elhanan Rosenstein. He studied philosophy and medicine at the University of Berlin, receiving his medical doctorate in 1854. From 1856 to 1858 he served as an assistant at the general hospital in Danzig, and afterwards worked as a physician in Berlin. In 1864 he obtained his habilitation and later became a professor of clinical medicine at the universities of Groningen (from 1866) and Leiden (from 1873). In 1898 he received an honorary doctorate from the University of Edinburgh.

His best work, "Die Pathologie und Therapie der Nierenkrankheiten" (Pathology and therapy of kidney diseases), was published over several editions. His "Einleitung zu den Krankheiten des Herzens" (Introduction to diseases of the heart) was included in Ziemssen's "Handbuch der speziellen Pathologie und Therapie". He was also the author of numerous medical works published in Virchows Archiv.
