= Börse Stuttgart =

Stock exchange in Germany

Coordinates: 48°46′48″N 9°10′32″E

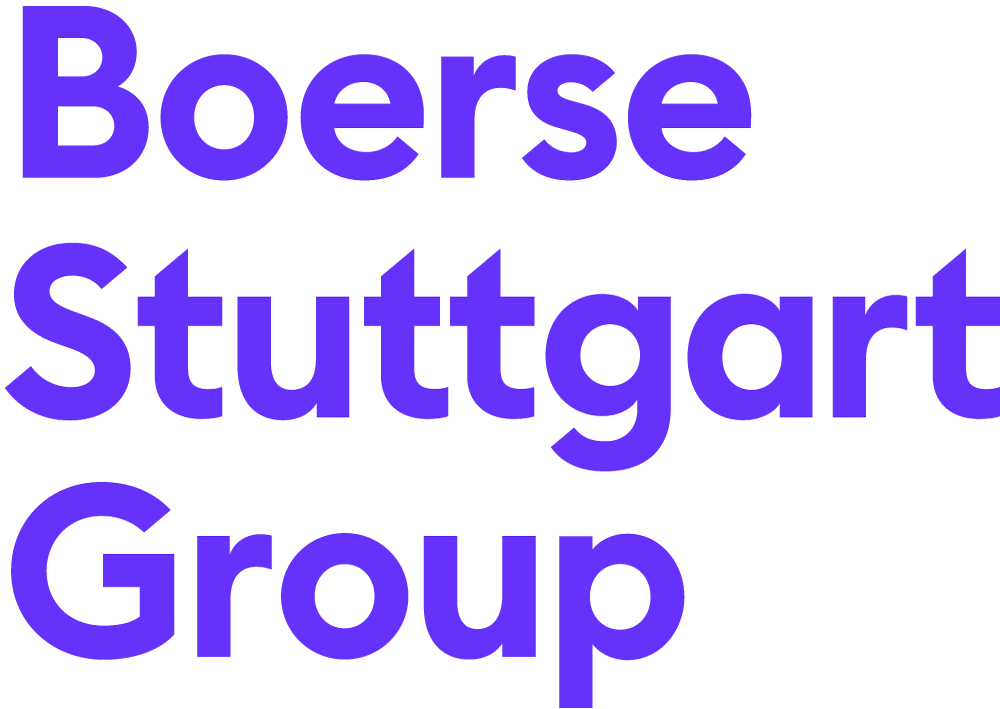
- Type: Stock exchange
- Location: Stuttgart, Germany
- Founded: 1861
- Website: group.boerse-stuttgart.com

Börse Stuttgart is the sixth largest exchange group in Europe. It has strategic pillars in the capital markets business as well as in the digital and cryptocurrency business. Börse Stuttgart Group employs around 700 people at its locations in Stuttgart, Berlin, Frankfurt, Ljubljana, Milan, Madrid, Stockholm, and Zürich and holds a total of 18 licences from regulatory authorities in Germany, Sweden and Switzerland.

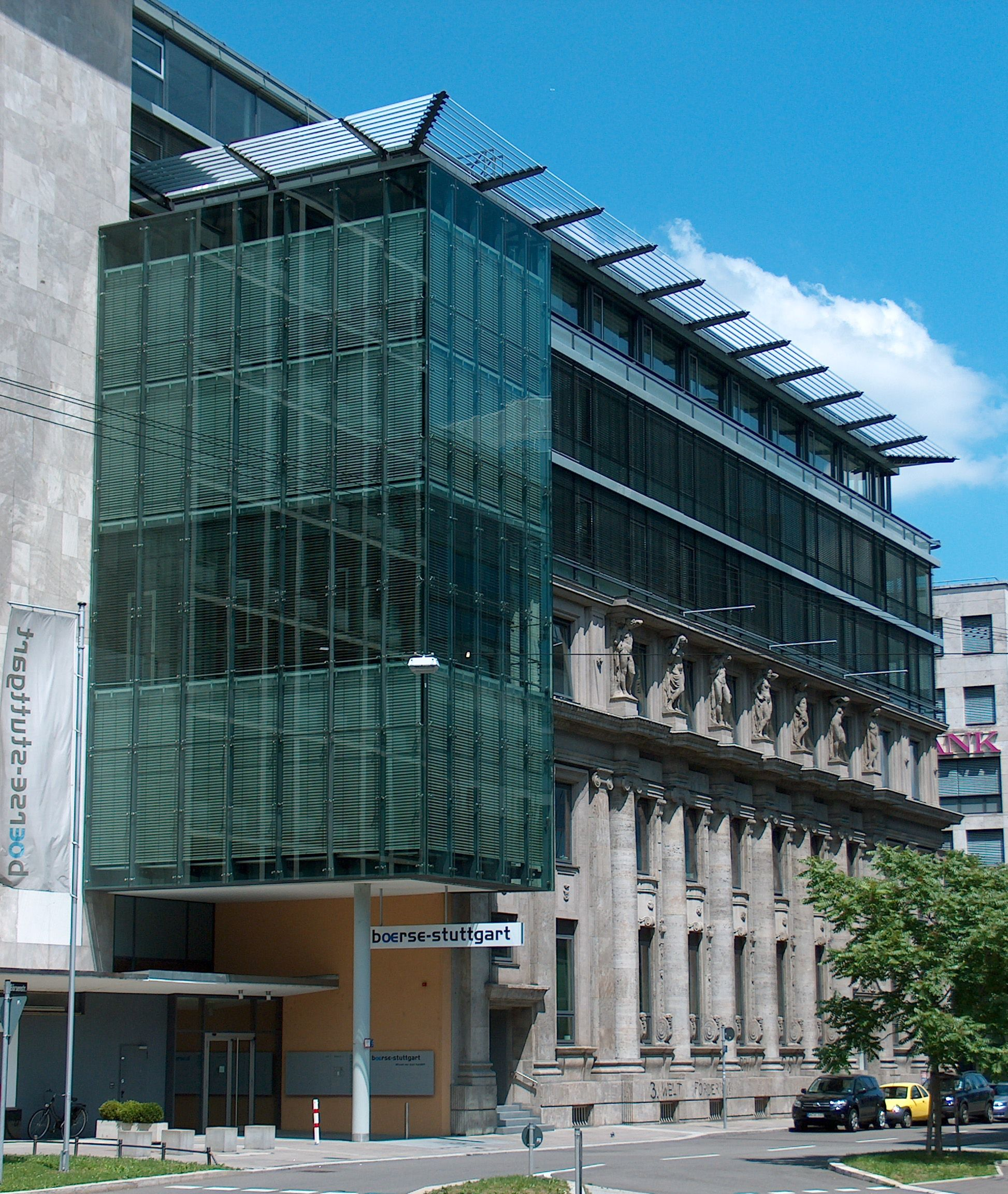
Börse Stuttgart

== Capital markets business ==
In its capital markets business, Börse Stuttgart Group operates three stock exchanges in Germany, Sweden, and Switzerland: Börse Stuttgart, NGM, and BX Swiss. Börse Stuttgart is the leading stock exchange for structured securities and corporate bond trading in Germany. NGM and BX Swiss are the second-largest stock exchanges in Sweden and Switzerland. On the three exchanges, more than 2,3 million securities are listed. Additionally, the Group operates the regulated zero fee securities trading platform TradeRebel in Germany, and the European trading network Cats. The Group also includes Euwax AG, a broker that is internationally active as a liquidity provider in securities and cryptocurrency trading.

== Börse Stuttgart Digital ==
Börse Stuttgart Group has bundled its entire digital and cryptocurrency business under the Börse Stuttgart Digital brand. Serving as an infrastructure partner, Börse Stuttgart Digital offers institutional clients trading and brokerage services, as well as cryptocurrency custody services. For retail clients, it offers the Bison app. Approximately 1,2 million end-users utilized the cryptocurrency offerings of Börse Stuttgart Digital in 2025. The digital and cryptocurrency business represents 25% of Börse Stuttgart Group's revenue.

=== For institutional clients ===
Börse Stuttgart Digital is an infrastructure provider for banks, brokers, and other financial institutions in Europe. It provides institutional brokerage applications for bilateral OTC trading in digital assets. Börse Stuttgart Digital Custody holds the licence as a crypto custodian since March 2023 and the EU-wide MiCAR license since January 2025 from the German Federal Financial Supervisory Authority (BaFin).Börse Stuttgart Digital Exchange is a regulated trading venue for cryptocurrencies, launched as a multilateral trading facility in 2019. In 2024, Börse Stuttgart Digital became the infrastructure partner of DZ Bank and the cooperative financial group for the brokerage and custody of cryptocurrencies. The Swiss investment software provider Profidata integrated Börse Stuttgart Digital's solutions for brokerage and custody into its offering for institutional clients. In 2025, Börse Stuttgart Digital became the partner of DekaBank for a cryptocurrency offering for retail customers of Sparkassen.

== Tokenized assets ==
In 2025, Börse Stuttgart Group established tokenized assets as its third strategic business area. Seturion is a pan-European settlement platform for tokenized assets that addresses the fragmented settlement landscape in Europe. Thanks to its open architecture, banks, brokers, and trading venues can connect to Seturion. In Switzerland, BX Digital is the first DLT trading system for tokenized assets regulated by the Swiss Financial Market Supervisory Authority (FINMA).

== History ==
The first predecessor of Börse Stuttgart was founded in 1860 as Industrie-Börsenverein (a local industrial stock exchange association). On 12 March 1860, the first meeting of merchants trading in textiles took place in the Königsbau. On 11 February 1861, the Stuttgarter Börsenverein was founded, leading to the inauguration of a stock exchange, which served as the direct predecessor of the later Börse Stuttgart.

In May 1877, Charles I of Württemberg, along with the Stuttgart city council, issued a decree authorizing stock exchange and brokerage regulations. Following this decree, the courts began recognizing the prices set by the stock exchange.

Since 1866, Württemberg's daily newspapers had been printing a daily stock exchange price quote sheet, and in 1881, the first official quote sheet appeared. In the following years, the textile industry was replaced as the leading sector by mechanical and automotive engineering, chemicals and electrical engineering. In 1882, the stock exchange received its first telephone connection, which accelerated the processing of orders.

The German stock exchanges did not operate during World War I and Börse Stuttgart remained closed until 1919. As a result of the global economic crisis and massive price losses, Börse Stuttgart closed again for several months in 1931.

Due to air raids, Börse Stuttgart had to relocate in 1944. After World War II, business was resumed in November 1945 in the burnt-out building of the Württembergische Landeskreditanstalt. After the German currency reform of 1948 and the reorganisation of securities, official stock exchange trading was resumed.

Börse Stuttgart relocated within Stuttgart again in 1969 and in 1974, the electronic processing of stock exchange transactions began. The Euwax trading segment for securitised derivatives was established in 1999.

In November 2008, Börse Stuttgart acquired Nordic Growth Market AB (NGM), the second-largest stock exchange in Sweden. NGM's NDX segment for securitised derivatives is not only active in Sweden, but also in Finland since 2010, in Norway since 2011, and in Denmark since 2016.

In 2014, Börse Stuttgart acquired 90% of the OTC trading network Cats from Citigroup. In 2017, Börse Stuttgart acquired the majority of shares in BX Swiss AG, completing the takeover in 2018. In January 2019, Börse Stuttgart launched the Bison app, at that time the only cryptocurrency trading app backed by a traditional stock exchange.

The institutional digital business of Börse Stuttgart was established in 2022. In 2023, Axel Springer SE and SBI Digital Asset Holding deepened their investment in the entire digital and crypto business of Börse Stuttgart, which has since been bundled under the Börse Stuttgart Digital brand. In March 2023, Börse Stuttgart Digital Custody GmbH received the licence for its operations as a crypto custodian from the German Federal Financial Supervisory Authority (BaFin).

In 2022, tokenised securities were traded on BX Swiss for the first time as part of a proof of concept. The trading transactions were processed via a blockchain. Börse Stuttgart also entered the zero-fee segment of securities trading. This included a BX Swiss offering in Switzerland and the launch of the regulated trading platform TradeRebel in Germany.

At the beginning of 2023, Börse Stuttgart launched the Easy Euwax segment, which enabled trading in structured securities without exchange fees. In December 2023, Börse Stuttgart established a strategic partnership with the Swiss financial company Leonteq, which acquired a 10% stake in BX Swiss.
