= Agency for Strategic Planning and Reforms (Kazakhstan) =

Coordinates: 51°5′17″N 71°25′2″E

Agency for Strategic Planning and Reforms of the Republic of Kazakhstan
- Қазақстан Республикасы Стратегиялық жоспарлау және реформалар агенттігі (Kazakh); Агентство по стратегическому планированию и реформам Республики Казахстан (Russian)
- Emblem of Kazakhstan

Agency overview
- Formed: September 8, 2020
- Headquarters: 55/6, Mangilik El, Astana
- Chairman responsible: Aset Irgaliyev
- Website: www.gov.kz/memleket/entities/aspr?lang=en

The Agency for Strategic Planning and Reforms of the Republic of Kazakhstan (Kazakh: Қазақстан Республикасы Стратегиялық жоспарлау және реформалар агенттігі; Russian: Агентство по стратегическому планированию и реформам Республики Казахстан) is a central state body accountable to the president, established in 2020 by president Kassym-Jomart Tokayev's decree and responsible for strategic planning, the implementation of reforms, and state statistics.

== List of chairs ==
=== Chairman of the Agency for Strategic Planning / Chairman of the Agency for Strategic Planning and Reforms ===
- Erjan Ötembaev (1997–1999)

=== Chairman of the Agency for Strategic Planning ===
- Kairat Kelimbetov (1999–2001)
- Eskendir Beisembetov (2001–2002)

=== Chairman of the Agency for Strategic Planning and Reforms ===
- Kairat Kelimbetov (2020–2022)
- Aset Irgaliyev (2022–2023)
- Jandos Shaimardanov (2023–2025)
- Aset Irgaliyev (since 2025)

== History ==
On March 24, 1997, president of Kazakhstan Nursultan Nazarbayev's decree, the Agency for Strategic Planning was established and subordinated to the president. However, on October 10, of the same year, it was reorganised into the Agency for Strategic Planning and Reforms, which was no longer subordinate to the president but to the Government. On June 30, 1998, by Nazarbayev's decree, the Agency was again placed under the president. At the same time, the Committee for Statistics and Analysis was separated from its structure and transformed into the National Statistical Agency, also subordinate to the president.

On August 28, 2002, the Agency for Strategic Planning and Reforms was incorporated into the Ministry of Economy and Budget Planning, which underwent multiple reorganisations and was ultimately transformed into the Ministry of National Economy in 2014.

On September 8, 2020, by president Kassym-Jomart Tokayev's decree, the Agency for Strategic Planning and Reforms was separated from the Ministry of National Economy, assuming responsibility for strategic planning and state statistical activities, and was again made subordinate to the president.

== Tasks ==
=== Tasks ===
- Manage and coordinate the entire state planning system, including National Development Plans.
- Develop and monitor the structural, institutional, and socio-economic reforms required to boost the country's global competitiveness and citizen well-being.
- Formulate and execute state policy in the field of state statistics, ensuring the societal and international demand for official data is met.

=== Duties ===
- Evaluate and monitor the implementation of system-wide structural reforms and strategic development plans.
- Study demographic changes to inform the public and design targeted measures for reforming various industrial sectors.
- Develop statistical methodologies and conduct statistical activities while managing the quality of administrative data.

=== Rights ===
- Propose strategies and improvements to the president regarding state policy in strategic planning, institutional reforms, and state statistics.
- Request and receive necessary socio-economic and administrative information from the Government, the National Bank, local executive bodies, and the quasi-public sector.
- Guide and coordinate other state bodies regarding statistical reporting and the execution of structural reforms.

== Structure ==
- Bureau of National Statistics.
