= Aliya Moldabekova =

Kazakh mathematician and bank official (born 1976)

- Әлия Молдабекова

Deputy Governor of the National Bank of Kazakhstan
- Incumbent
- Assumed office 26 December 2019
- Governor: Timur Suleimenov

Personal details
- Born: 4 May 1976 (age 50) Almaty, Kazakh SSR, Soviet Union
- Education: Al-Farabi Kazakh National University

Aliya Meirbekovna Moldabekova (Kazakh: Әлия Мейірбекқызы Молдабекова; born 4 May 1976) is a Kazakh mathematician and bank official. She has been serving as Deputy Governor of the National Bank of Kazakhstan since 2019 and as Chairwoman of the Kazakhstan Stock Exchange since 2024.

== Early life and education ==
Moldabekova was born on 4 May 1976 in Almaty, Kazakh SSR, Soviet Union. She graduated from the Al-Farabi Kazakh National University in 1999, where got a PhD in physics and mathematics.

== Career ==
In 1999 she worked in the Al-Farabi Kazakh National University's Department of Mathematical Software and Cybernetic Mathematics. Moldabekova began working at the National Bank of Kazakhstan in 2001. She worked as a senior analyst and head of analysis in the analysis and risk management department, deputy head of the monetary operations department, and was subsequently appointed head of that department in February 2019.

On 26 December 2019, president Kassym-Jomart Tokayev appointed her as one of the Deputy Governor of the National Bank. Moldabekova oversees the monetary operations department and is charge of the country’s international reserves and, in an analysis she published in 2022, she defended the strategy of maintaining a high proportion of gold within the state reserves and the role of the national bank.

Moldabekova was appointed Chairwoman of the Kazakhstan Stock Exchange on 5 June 2024.
