= Kadyrzhan Damitov =

Kazakh financier (born 1959)

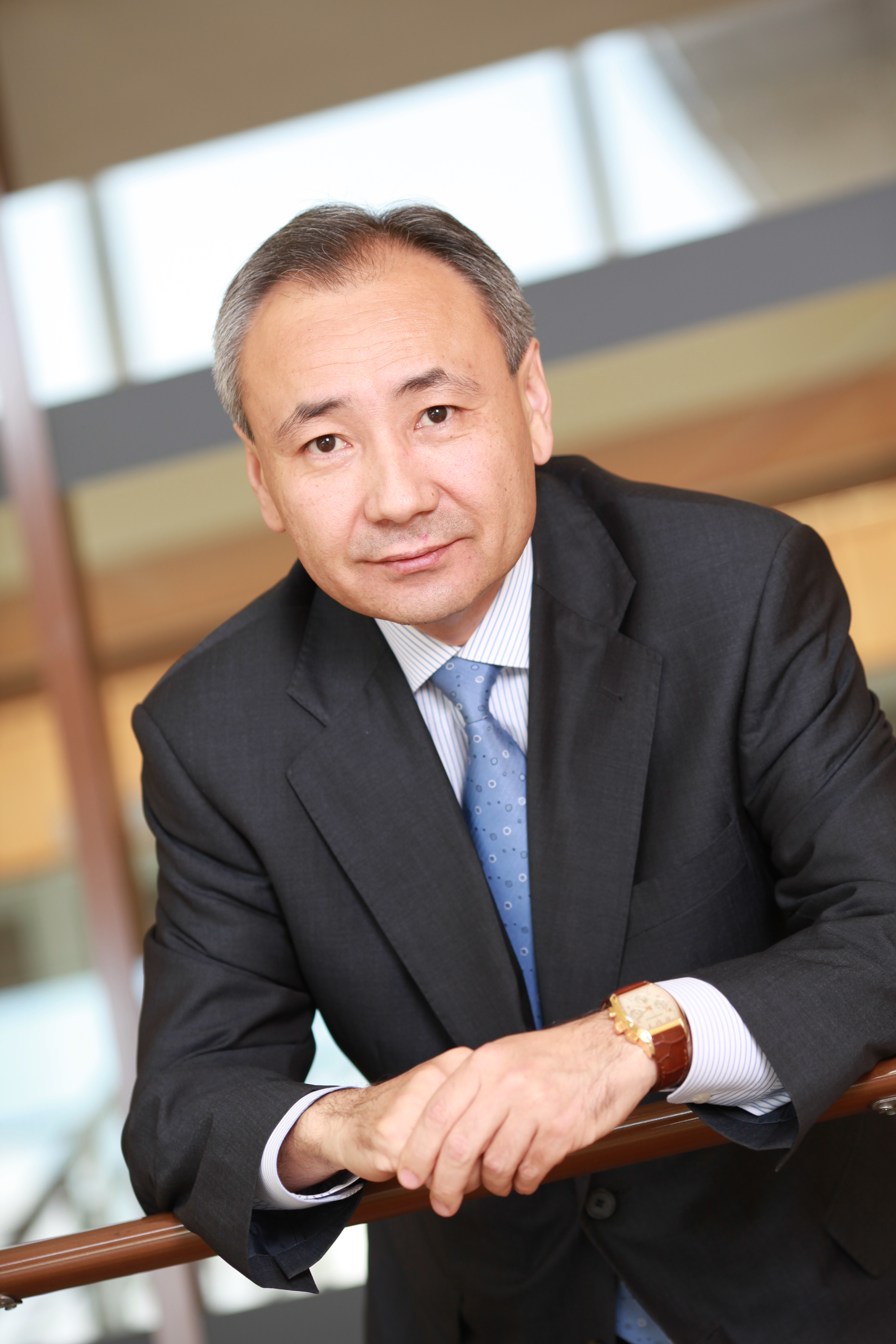
- Damitov in 2009

4th Chairman of National Bank of Kazakhstan
- In office 20 February 1998 – 12 October 1999
- President: Nursultan Nazarbayev
- Preceded by: Oraz Jandosov
- Succeeded by: Grigori Marchenko

Personal details
- Born: 16 December 1959 (age 66) Oskemen, Kazakh SSR, Soviet Union
- Spouse: Tynym Damitova
- Education: Narxoz University

Kadyrzhan Qabdoshuly Damitov (Kazakh: Qadyrjan Qabdoshuly Dámıtov; born 16 December 1959) is a Kazakh financier who is the president of the Kazakhstan Stock Exchange (KASE).

== Education and career ==
Kadyrzhan K. Damitov graduated from Alma-Ata Institute of National Economy in 1982 majoring in Engineering and Economics (Almaty, Kazakhstan) and holds a PhD in Corporate Management and Finance (1988) from the Moscow Financial Institute (Moscow, Russia).

Prior to resuming charges as the President of Kazakhstan Stock Exchange (KASE) in May 2009, Mr. Damitov worked in various sectors: business, government and academia. He developed companies' operations, participated in policy-making processes in regards to the various sectors of economy, fostered development of the country's financial market regulatory system.

He began his career in 1984 working as university professor of Economics at Alma-Ata Institute of National Economy and later on devoted time to scientific research at the Kazakhstan Academy of Sciences. Further on in 1991 he joined "Alem Bank Kazakhstan" starting his career at the bank as Chief Economist and at the time of departure from the bank in 1994 held the position of the First Deputy Chairman of the Board.

Mr. Damitov contributed to the establishment and development of the financial market of Kazakhstan. He worked both at the National Bank (Central Bank) of the Republic of Kazakhstan, as well as private local banks and branches of the large foreign banks operating in Kazakhstan. In 1994–1997 he worked as Deputy Governor of the National Bank of Kazakhstan. Later he was promoted to the Vice-Minister of Economy and Trade of the Republic of Kazakhstan (1997) followed by his advisory position to the country's Prime-Minister (1997-1998). Then in 1998, at a time of Asian and Russian financial crisis, returned to the banking regulation activity in a capacity of the Governor of the National Bank, from 1998 to 1999. After heading the National Bank for almost two years he was assigned to the position of the Advisor to the President of the Republic of Kazakhstan.

His career in the private sector was not limited only to the banking sector, he also worked in other sectors of the economy. In the private banking sector he worked at "ABN AMRO Bank Kazakhstan" during the years of 2000-2004 in the capacity of Deputy Chairman of the Board. From March 2004 until 2007 he was a member of the Board of Directors of Ust-Kamenogorsk Titanium Magnesium Plant and further on until 2009 he was the Chairman of the Board of the National Company "Social Entrepreneurship Corporation "Ertis"".

During 2000-2007 he was simultaneously a Member of the Board of Directors at such financial institutions as ABN AMRO Pension Fund and Halyk Savings Bank of Kazakhstan, as well as at the sovereign development institution - Fund for Sustainable Development "Kazyna".

== Recognition ==
Mr. Damitov holds national awards for his contribution to the development of Kazakhstan's economy.
