= Aset Irgaliyev =

Kazakh politician

- Әсет Ерғалиев
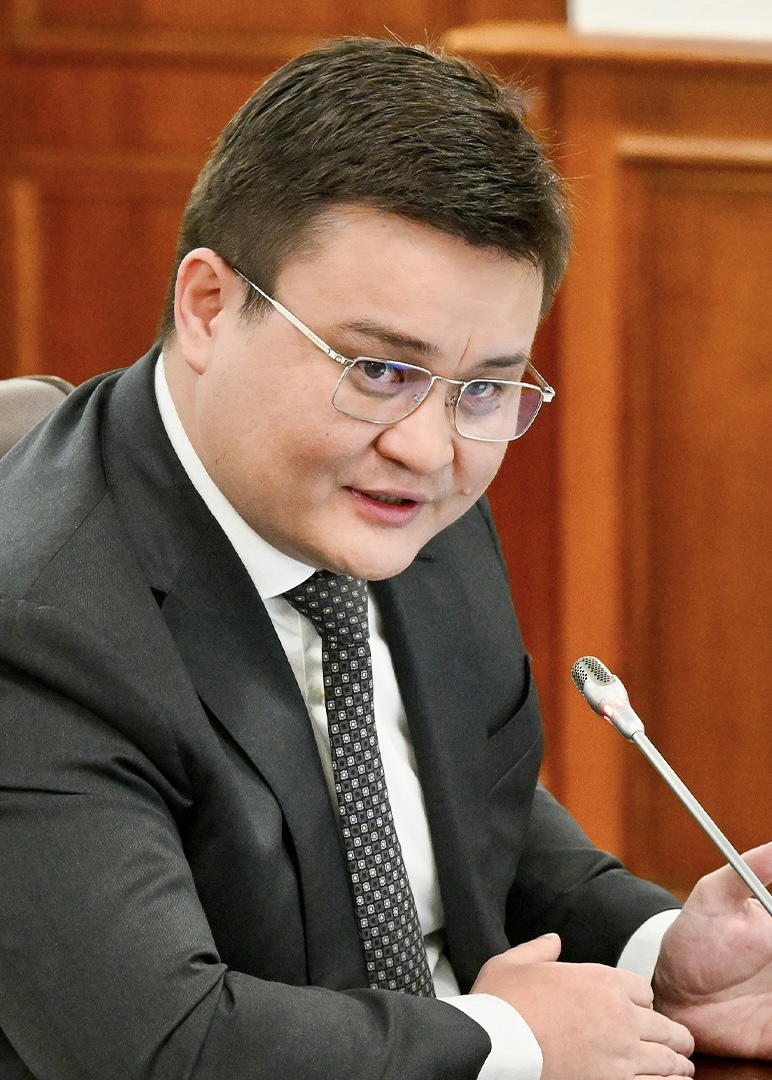
- Irgaliyev in 2026

Aide to the president of Kazakhstan
- Incumbent
- Assumed office 2 February 2026
- President: Kassym-Jomart Tokayev

Chairman of the Agency for Strategic Planning and Reforms
- Incumbent
- Assumed office 28 February 2025
- President: Kassym-Jomart Tokayev
- Preceded by: Jandos Şaimardanov
- In office 6 January 2022 – 2 September 2023
- President: Kassym-Jomart Tokayev
- Preceded by: Kairat Kelimbetov
- Succeeded by: Jandos Şaimardanov

Kazakh permanent delegate to World Trade Organization
- In office 16 May 2024 – 28 February 2025
- President: Kassym-Jomart Tokayev
- Preceded by: Zhanar Aitzhanova
- Succeeded by: Qairat Törebaev

Assistant to the president on Economic Affairs
- In office 2 September 2023 – 16 May 2024
- President: Kassym-Jomart Tokayev
- Preceded by: Office established
- Succeeded by: Qanat Şarlapaev

Minister of National Economy
- In office 18 January 2021 – 5 January 2022
- President: Kassym-Jomart Tokayev
- Prime Minister: Asqar Mamin
- Preceded by: Ruslan Dälenov
- Succeeded by: Älibek Quantyrov

Personal details
- Born: 18 June 1986 (age 40) Kostanay, Kazakh SSR, Soviet Union
- Education: KIMEP University; Jönköping International Business School; University of York; University of Nottingham
- Occupation: politician

Aset Armanuly Irgaliyev (Note: Romanized from Russian: Асет Арманулы Иргалиев) (Kazakh: Әсет Арманұлы Ерғалиев, romanized: Äset Armanūly Erğaliev; born 18 June 1986) is a Kazakh politician and diplomat serving as the aide to the president since 2026 and chairman of the Agency for Strategic Planning and Reforms since 2025. He previously served as the minister of national economy from 2021 to 2022.

== Biography ==
=== Early life and education ===
Irgaliyev was born on 18 June 1986 in the city of Kostanay. He is married and has two children.

In 2008 Irgaliyev graduated from KIMEP University with a bachelor's degree in Economics of Public Policy. In the same year, under the international exchange program, he graduated from the Jönköping International Business School in Sweden with a bachelor's degree in Science in International Economics. In 2009, he obtained a master's degree of Science in economics from the University of York in England. In 2010, Irgaliyev graduated from the University of Nottingham, with a master's degree in Philosophy of Economics.

In 2020, Aset was awarded the Eren Enbegi Ushin medal.

=== Career ===
- From September 2010 to January 2013 - Aset served as a Regional Analyst for Eastern Europe and the Caucasus at the Economic Department of the European Bank for Reconstruction and Development in London, UK.
- From January 2013 to June 2016 - Vice President, Deputy Chairman of the management board, First Deputy Chairman of the management board, chairman of the Board of the «Economic Research Institute» JSC of the Ministry of National Economy of the Republic of Kazakhstan.
- From October to December 2016 - Advisor to the chairman of the management board of JSC «NMH Baiterek».
- From December 2016 to August 2017 - Advisor to the Prime Minister of the Republic of Kazakhstan.
- From August 2017 to September 2018 - Head of the Project Management Center of the Office of the Prime Minister of the Republic of Kazakhstan.
- From September 2018 to March 2019 - Vice Minister of National Economy of the Republic of Kazakhstan.
- From March to August 2019 - Deputy Head of the Office of the Prime Minister of the Republic of Kazakhstan.
- From August 2019 to January 2021 - The First Vice Minister of the National Economy of the Republic of Kazakhstan.
- From January 2021 to January 2022 - Minister of National Economy of the Republic of Kazakhstan.
- From January 2022 to September 2023 - The Chairman of the Agency for Strategic Planning and Reforms of Kazakhstan.

== Honours ==
Ribbon bar	Honour	Date and comment
	Eren Eñbegı Üşın	14 December 2020
