= Daniyar Adilbekov =

Kazakhstani investigative journalist

- Данияр Әділбеков
- Citizenship: Kazakhstan
- Occupation: Investigative journalist
- Organization: Dikaya orda
- Criminal charges: Knowingly false denunciation Disseminating knowingly false information
- Criminal penalty: 4 years imprisonment Fine
- Criminal status: Detained

Daniyar Adilbekov (Kazakh: Данияр Әділбеков, romanized: Danïyar Ädilbekov; born c. 1989) is a Kazakhstani investigative journalist. In 2024, he was sentenced to four and a half years in prison for "false dissemination" after reporting on alleged corruption within the Ministry of Energy, becoming the first journalist in Kazakhstan to be convicted on such charges.

== Biography ==
Adilbekov often reported on state corruption, posting articles on the Telegram channel "Dikaya orda" (Russian: Дикая орда, lit. 'Wild Horde'). In early 2024, he published two articles concerning alleged corruption linked to the deputy Minister of Energy, Erlan Akkenzhenov, entitled "Akkenzhenov's Dirty Petrodollars" and "Who Are You, Mr. Akkenzhenov?". Adilbekov reported that the Dutch energy trading company Vitol was able to purchase raw oil materials from Kazakhstan at a reduced price and sell them abroad at inflate prices thanks to internal levers within the Ministry of Energy.

In March 2024, Akkenzhenov filed a criminal complaint against Adilbekov as well as his informant, oil trader Erlan Saudegerov, accusing them of slander and false denunciation. At the same time, Yusuf Rashed Muhammad al Jawder, the chairman of the board of Nursultan Nazarbayev International Airport, and journalist Gulzhan Yergaliyeva also filed complaints against Adilbekov, over articles he had written about the management of the airport and reporting on the murder trial of Kuandyk Bishimbayev, respectively.

Adilbekov was arrested and detained later that month while he was driving; he was not permitted access to a lawyer. At the same time, a search occurred of his home, and his mobile phone, as well as those of his wife and daughter, were seized. Adilbekov commented that the case against him was "custom-made and fabricated" and stated he had been tortured by officials from the National Security Committee, whom he said had threatened to press false charges against his wife, in addition to denying him access to his family, confiscating his property, and prohibiting him from accessing a lawyer. The National Security Committee denied the allegations.

On 3 May 2024, to mark World Press Freedom Day, more than a dozen Kazakhstani journalists issued a public appeal calling on the President of Kazakhstan, Kassym-Jomart Tokayev, to release Adilbekov from custody and to ensure a transparent investigation into his case. They described Adilbekov's ongoing detention as "disproportionate" as his alleged offences did not constitute a danger to the public.

Adilbekov's trial began in October 2024 at the Astana Interdistrict Criminal Court; Zhaniya Urankayeva, a journalist reporting on the trial, criticised the investigation into Adilbekov as being "full of technical errors and typos" which were "disregarded" by the prosecution, despite Adilbekov being tried for "incorrectly written words".

On 18 October 2024, Adilbekov was sentenced to four and a half years in prison for "knowingly false denunciation" and "disseminating knowingly false information". The court concluded that the forensic psychological and philological examinations of the articles in addition to "witness testimony" from Yergaliyeva was "sufficient" to determine Adilbekov's guilt. He was also ordered to pay 2.2 million KZT to Yergaliyeva for "emotional distress" in addition to court expenses. His co-defendant, Erlan Saudegerov, received a three year suspended sentence and probation.

In November 2024, Radio Free Europe/Radio Liberty's Kazakh-language service was found guilty of false dissemination after reporting on 12 September that prosecutors intended to request an eight year sentence for Adilbekov, also on false dissemination charges. The Press.kz website reported that it had been jammed after it posted articles about Adilbekov in September 2024.

Human Rights Watch stated that Adilbekov should be granted a fair appeals process, adding that imprisonment was an "inappropriate and disproportionate" sentence for a charge of reputational harm. Gulmira Birzhanova of the Legal Media Centre stated Adilbekov's case marked the first time a journalist in Kazakhstan had been convicted of making a "knowingly false denunciation". Article 19 and Reporters Without Borders both called for Adilbekov's release and for the repeal of the "false information law", while the South East Europe Media Organisation criticised the charges against Adilbekov as being "questionable" and called on Kazakhstani authorities to ensure the protection of journalists from persecution.
