= Abiyev =

Abiyev (Azerbaijani: Əbiyev) is an Azerbaijani surname. Notable people with the surname include:

- Jeyhun Abiyev (born 1974), Azerbaijani boxer
- Marat Abiyev (born 1989), Kazakh businessman
- Safar Abiyev (born 1950), Azerbaijani general and politician
