= Andrey Viktorovich Burmistrov =

Kazakh entrepreneur in the oil refining sector

Burmistrov Andrey Viktorovich
- Бурмистров Андрей Викторович
- Born: November 17, 1976; Karaganda, Kazakhstan
- Citizenship: Kazakhstan
- Education: Olympic Reserve School №2, Almaty, Kazakhstan
- Known for: Mangystau Oil Refining (MOR)
- Spouse: Burmistrova Oksana Valentinovna
- Children: 2

Burmistrov Andrey Viktorovich (born November 17, 1976, Karaganda, Kazakh SSR) is a Kazakh entrepreneur in the oil refining sector, founder and co-owner of several companies engaged in the processing of hydrocarbon raw materials and the export of petroleum products.

== Biography ==
From 1983 to 1993, he studied at School №27 in Karaganda.

Between 1993 and 1996, he attended the Olympic Reserve School №2 in Almaty. In 1996–1997, he worked as a saber fencing coach at Youth Sports School №2 in Almaty.

== Entrepreneurial Activities ==
In 1998, Burmistrov founded KazInCom LTD, a company specializing in the supply of lime and the processing of limestone into carbide for further distribution in Central Asian countries.

In 2001, he established KazTechStalProm, which supplied steel grinding balls for ore milling operations and exported scrap metal to Turkey and China.

In 2007, he founded Silk Road Consulting in Aktau, a company involved in the supply of crude oil for processing in Atyrau.

In 2013, together with Igor Burmistrov and Albert Abdurakhmanov, he acquired a railway tank cleaning facility, which was later modernized and transformed into the Mangystau Oil Refining (MOR) plant.

In 2020, the second stage of the modernization of the hydrocarbon processing complex was put into operation, costing 2 billion tenge and creating 50 jobs. The third stage of the modernization of the complex was planned for 2022, costing 10.6 billion tenge and creating 50 jobs.

The plant has a production capacity of 300,000 tons of crude oil per year. In 2022, the facility processed 220,000 tons of petroleum products, including 27,500 tons of diesel fuel.

In response to changing regulatory conditions in Kazakhstan, in 2015, Burmistrov and his partners established KazKom SA in Switzerland, transferring ownership of Mangystau Oil Refining and affiliated logistics companies to this entity.

== Legal and Regulatory Challenges ==
Since 2015, companies associated with Burmistrov have been subjected to inspections by Kazakhstan's tax and law enforcement authorities. According to Burmistrov's statements in, he encountered challenges from regulatory bodies.

Mangystau Oil Refining has previously been subject to inspections by tax and law enforcement agencies. In 2018, a criminal case was opened against the company on suspicion of smuggling oil and oil products, but it was closed due to lack of evidence.

In 2023, the company encountered difficulties in agreeing on technical conditions for the construction of an oil pipeline, which also attracted the attention of regulatory authorities.

In 2023, the National Security Committee of the Republic of Kazakhstan, together with the prosecutor's office of the Turkestan region, stopped an illegal channel for exporting Kazakhstani oil products abroad, including by sea. The company involved in this case was BatysNefteTrade LLP, which was engaged in the export of oil products produced at Mangystau Oil Refining. The investigation is ongoing, and the details are not disclosed in the interests of the investigation.

In 2024, Mangystau Oil Refining investors expressed concern about a possible shutdown of production, which could lead to financial and tax consequences for the company.

In addition, in 2024, the Ministry of Energy of the Republic of Kazakhstan approved the production passport of the Mangystau Oil Refining oil refinery plant in the Turkestan region, which indicates recognition of the company's compliance with the established requirements.

In response, he and his partners moved some of their business assets outside Kazakhstan.

== Legal Disputes and Investment Challenges ==
Despite Kazakhstan’s stated commitment to fostering a favorable investment climate, foreign investors have faced significant legal and regulatory challenges. One such case involves Mangystau Oil Refining (MOR) and its acquisition of an oil refinery in the Turkestan region.

In 2022, the Swiss company KazKom SA, invested in Kazakhstan by acquiring Mangystau Oil Refining (MOR), a company specializing in hydrocarbon processing. The company subsequently won an auction for the bankrupt Stratus Oil refinery in the Turkestan region. The auction, which had failed to attract buyers on nine previous occasions, was successfully completed in July 2022, with Mangystau Oil Refining (MOR) as the highest bidder. However, following the acquisition, the former owner of Stratus Oil, Maksat Tasbulatov, initiated legal proceedings, alleging that the auction process was flawed.

Initially, the Specialized Interdistrict Economic Court of Turkestan Region upheld the validity of the auction in October 2022, a decision that was later confirmed by the Turkestan Regional Court in January 2023. With legal hurdles seemingly resolved, Mangystau Oil Refining (MOR) finalized the purchase agreement in April 2023 and began investing in the restoration and modernization of the refinery. By October 2024, the Kazakh Ministry of Energy had approved the refinery’s production passport, signaling its operational readiness. However, renewed legal challenges soon emerged.

In late 2023, the Supreme Court of Kazakhstan unexpectedly ordered a retrial of the auction process, citing concerns over the sale price. The Court recommended an independent judicial appraisal to reassess the refinery’s market value at the time of sale. However, no such appraisal was conducted.

Legal experts, including Professor Arman Shaikenov of KIMEP University, criticized the ruling, arguing that an auction protocol does not constitute a contractual agreement under Kazakhstan’s Civil Code. Despite these objections, in May 2024, the Turkestan Regional Court ruled the auction invalid. The decision triggered further legal actions, culminating in an August 2024 ruling by the Specialized Economic Court of Turkestan Region, which nullified the purchase agreement between Mangystau Oil Refining (MOR) and the bankruptcy trustee of Stratus Oil.

Legal expert Valikhan Shaikenov, representing Shaikenov Law Experts (SHEL), condemned the ruling, stating that pricing errors during a bankruptcy auction should not impact the validity of a purchase agreement, especially when the buyer acted in good faith. As of 2025, the case remains under appeal, with Mangystau Oil Refining (MOR) seeking to overturn the ruling and retain ownership of the refinery.

Beyond its legal battles over the Turkestan refinery, Mangystau Oil Refining (MOR) has also been subject to law enforcement scrutiny in the Mangystau region. In April 2024, the Almaty Department of Economic Investigations launched a criminal probe into Norvis LLP, and related businesses, including KazKom SA, and Mangystau Oil Refining (MOR), for alleged tax evasion through fictitious invoicing schemes. The General Prosecutor’s Office of Kazakhstan confirmed that the investigation targeted companies suspected of causing significant financial damage to the state
