= Kazakhstan Stock Exchange =

Stock exchange located in Almaty, Kazakhstan

- Қазақстан қор биржасы Qazaqstan qor bırjasy
- Type: Stock Exchange
- Location: Almaty, Kazakhstan
- Coordinates: 43.2373°N 76.9155°E
- Founded: November 17, 1993
- Owner: Shareholders
- Key people: Alina Aldambergen (CEO); Aliya Moldabekova (Chairman of the Board of Directors)
- Currency: tenge
- No. of listings: 194
- Market cap: US$45.3 billion (2020) Shares
- Volume: US$572.5 million (2020) Volume and structure of market turnover
- Indices: KASE Index; Bonds Indices
- Website: kase.kz

The Kazakhstan Stock Exchange (KASE; Kazakh: Қазақстан қор биржасы, romanized: Qazaqstan qor bırjasy) is a stock exchange located in Almaty, Kazakhstan. The exchange was founded in 1993.

== History ==
On November 15, 1993, Kazakhstan introduced its own currency, the tenge. The next day, November 17, 1993, the National Bank of Kazakhstan and 23 local leading commercial banks took a decision to found a currency exchange. The previously existing Center for execution of inter-bank currency transactions (Currency exchange) used to be a structural unit of Kazakhstan's National Bank. The main task assigned to the new exchange was to set up and develop the national currency market following the introduction of the tenge. The exchange was incorporated as a closed joint-stock company on December 30, 1993, under the name Kazakhstan Inter-Bank Currency Exchange.

On March 3, 1994, the exchange was re-registered under the name Kazakhstan Interbank Currency Exchange due to the need to match the exchange's name to the current legislation.

On July 12, 1995, the exchange was re-registered under the name Kazakhstan Inter-Bank Currency and Stock Exchange following the shareholders' decision to let the exchange begin operating on the securities market. On October 2, 1995, the exchange obtained license No. 1 to carry stock exchange transactions, however this license only covered the right to operate trading in government securities only. On April 12, 1996, the exchange was re-registered under the name Kazakhstan Stock Exchange, since the current legislation banned the stock exchange from carrying out functions of a commodity exchange. On November 13, 1996, the exchange obtained an unlimited license to operate securities trading from the National Commission of the Republic of Kazakhstan on Securities.

Since the new Act of the Republic of Kazakhstan "On Securities" dated March 5, 1997 restricted the stock exchange's operation to securities only, the general meeting of shareholders in April 1997 decided to reorganize it by making it separate closed joint-stock company Almaty Financial Instruments Exchange (AFINEX), which was registered on July 30, 1997. As of September 1, 1997 the trading in foreign currencies and futures contracts moved to the AFINEX trading floor. The exchange itself underwent a re-registration in July 1997 retaining its former name.

With the Act of the Republic of Kazakhstan "On Making Changes and Additions to Some Legal Acts of the Republic of Kazakhstan Regarding Joint-Stock Companies" of July 10, 1998 coming into effect, the ban prohibiting the exchange to operate trading in foreign currencies and financial instruments other than securities, was lifted, which made it possible to affiliate the AFINEX to the exchange. The relevant decision was taken at a general meeting of shareholders on January 6, 1999, and on March 16, 1999, an appropriate state re-registration of the reunited exchange was effected.

On December 15, 2006, KASE was authorized as a special trading floor of the regional financial center of Almaty. On August 23, 2007, a general meeting of KASE shareholders took a decision to commercialize KASE. As part of KASE commercialization, the former voting principle "one shareholder – one vote" was scrapped and the traditional principle "one share – one vote at the general meeting" was adopted.

== Main stages in formation and development of KASE ==
1993	Start of foreign currency trading
1995	Start of government securities trading
1996	Start of futures contracts trading
1997	Start of trading in listed shares, state-owned shareholdings, and unlisted securities
1998	Launch of direct deals system on KASE Start of trading in Kazakh Eurobonds
1999	Start of trading in listed corporate and municipal bonds Launch of nego repo market
2001	Start of trading in bonds of international financial institutions Launch of auto repo market
2002	First trading in promissory notes
2003	Start of trading in foreign government securities
2006	Start of trading in foreign corporate bonds IPO of KazMunaiGas Exploration Production using KASE settlement system
2007	Creation on KASE of a special trading floor of the regional financial center Almaty Commercialization of KASE
2008	Approval of KASE's Corporate Governance Code Launch of currency swap transactions market
2009	Restoration of market uniformity through amalgamation of KASE main trading floor and RFCA special trading floor
2010	Launch of modernized derivatives market based on new risk management system
2011	Inclusion of KASE in list of Dow Jones FEAS participants Launch of a securities trading system based on T+0 (gross) settlements scheme with fully pre-positioned collateral Conducting of 17th General Assembly of Federation of Euro-Asian Stock Exchanges (FEAS) Signing of mutual co-operation memorandums with Korea Exchange, Istanbul Stock Exchange and Tehran Stock Exchange Creation of new multi-functional online trading system "STrade"
2012	KASE obtains licenses for performing clearing of transactions in financial instruments and for carrying out particular types of banking transactions (opening and maintaining of bank accounts for legal persons) Setting up of clearing department on KASE
2013	Launch of new shares index – Kazakhstan Traded Index Local (KTX Local) – calculated by Wiener Borse AG (WBAG) KASE obtains status of fully-fledged member in World Federation of Exchanges (WFE)
2014	The first trades in the Chinese yuan (CNY) Launch of yield indicators of currency swap transactions SWAP-1D and SWAP-2D Launch of the exchange market indicator of short money MM index KEGOC JSK IPO s part of the "People`s IPO" program

== KASE today ==
=== Status ===
The Exchange is a commercial organization operating as a joint-stock company. Bodies of the Exchange are as follows:

- supreme body – general meeting of Exchange shareholders;
- governing body – Exchange Board of Directors;
- executive body – Management Board.

=== Exchange management ===
- Alina Aldambergen – Chairman of Management Board
- Zhainar Sarzhakov – deputy Chairman of Management Board
- Andrei Tsalyuk – deputy Chairman of Management Board
- Natalya Khoroshevskaya – deputy Chairman of Management Board
- Ermek Mazhekenov – deputy Chairman of Management Board

=== Licenses ===
KASE holds the following licenses issued by the Committee for Control and Supervision of the Financial Market and Financial Organizations of the National Bank of the Republic of Kazakhstan:

- license for carrying out banking transactions in the national and foreign currency (No. 5.3.3 issued on June 29, 2012);
- license for carrying out transactions on the securities market (including operations involving operation of trading in securities and other financial instruments and clearing of deals in financial instruments on the securities market) (No. 4.2.3/1 issued on July 19, 2012).

Activities of the Exchange are mainly regulated by the following normative legal acts:

1. The Civil Code of the Republic of Kazakhstan;
2. The Act of the Republic of Kazakhstan "On Joint-Stock Companies";
3. The Act of the Republic of Kazakhstan "On the Securities Market";
4. The Act of the Republic of Kazakhstan "On Investment Funds";
5. the Rules for Execution of Activities of the Operator of Trading in Securities and Other Financial Instruments approved by resolution No. 170 of the Agency of the Republic of Kazakhstan for Control and Supervision of the Financial Market and Financial Organizations dated October 29, 2008;
6. Resolution No. 195 of the management board of the Agency of the Republic of Kazakhstan on Regulation and Supervision of Financial Market and Financial Organizations "On Requirements for the Trading Operator's Organizational Structure and for the Composition of the Stock Exchange’s Listing Commission and on Approval of the Rules of Operation for the Trading Operator’s Structural Unit Monitoring Transactions Executed in the Trading Operator’s Trading System" dated November 28, 2008.
7. Resolution No. 77 of the management board of the Agency of the Republic of Kazakhstan on Regulation and Supervision of Financial Market and Financial Organizations "On Requirements for Issuers and Their Securities (Being) Admitted to Circulation at a Stock Exchange, as well as to Particular Categories of a Stock Exchange’s List" dated May 26, 2008;
8. Resolution No. 196 of the management board of the Agency of the Republic of Kazakhstan on Regulation and Supervision of Financial Market and Financial Organizations "On Approval of the Rules for Classifying Deals Concluded in the Organized Securities Market as Executed for Purposes of Manipulation, for Setting Up and Operation of the Exchange’s Board of Directors’ Committee on Classifying Securities Deals as Executed for Purposes of Manipulation, as well as on Approval of its Quantitative Composition" dated November 28, 2008.

=== KASE shareholders ===
As of December 1, 2019, the total number of announced common shares of Kazakhstan Stock Exchange Inc. makes up 5,000,000 units, 974,373 shares are placed, the number of shares repurchased by the Exchange is 13,329. 49.1% of the total number of outstanding shares is held by the National Bank of the Republic of Kazakhstan in accordance with resolution No.

KASE's Articles of Incorporation stipulate a "golden share", which is held by the National Bank of the Republic of Kazakhstan. It carries the right to vote decisions made by KASE bodies on issues of currency regulation and regulation of Kazakhstan government bonds market.

=== Members ===
KASE has three categories of membership. Depending on the type of financial instruments an organization is interested to trade in, it can become a member of KASE's currency, stock or derivatives. It is also possible to enjoy simultaneous membership in two or three of these categories.

53 professional market participants held the KASE member status as of October 1, 2018.

=== Participation in activities of international institutions ===
KASE is:

- an affiliate member of the World Federation of Exchanges (WFE) representing more than 80 world exchanges which control almost the entire turnover of the global stock market;
- a member of the Federation of Euro-Asian Stock Exchanges (FEAS) uniting 50 professional institutions of the exchange industry operating on emerging stock markets in Europe and Asia;
- a member of the International Association of Exchanges of the Commonwealth of Independent States (IAE CIS) representing about 20 organizations from 9 CIS countries;
- a member of the Financial Information Services Division of the Software and Information Industry Association (FISD / SIIA) consisting of over 200 members, among which are the largest world exchanges, banks, brokers and investment companies as well as leading information agencies;
- a member of the Association of Financiers of Kazakhstan (AFK) which is the largest professional association in Kazakhstan's financial market, with about 250 members;
- a member of the Exchange Association of Kazakhstan (EAK), founded in 2011 and uniting 7 financial institutions represented by exchanges and market participants. The association has been founded to form and develop regulated (exchange) markets in Kazakhstan, including development of stock exchange acts.

== KASE markets ==
KASE operates the following markets:

- foreign currency (including currency swap transactions) market;
- government securities market;
- equity securities (shares and units) market;
- corporate debt securities market;
- repo transactions market;
- derivatives market.

=== Foreign currencies market ===
The currency market is one of the first markets organized on KASE and it has been operating since the latter's inception. The first foreign currency trading in US dollars took place in 1993. Today, transactions on this market account for about half of the total volume of trade on KASE. Main participants of KASE currency market are Kazakhstan's second-tier banks and the National Bank of the Republic of Kazakhstan.

Currently, trading on KASE is conducted in US dollars, euros, Chinese yuan and the Russian Ruble and the tenge, as is Euro-USD trading. Pairs USD/KZT and EUR/KZT along with regular transactions are traded as currency swaps with terms of one and two days.

Traditionally, USD/KZT trades make up more than 95% of the turnover in the foreign currency market. Throughout the day, KASE holds three foreign currency trading sessions: morning, afternoon and evening sessions. The first two are dedicated to trades settled on the day of transaction and in the evening session currency is traded according to the Т+1 and Т+2 settlement schemes.

At the end of a trading day, KASE performs net-clearing of each currency instrument. Settlements are made by KASE Settlements department based on data provided by the Clearing department according to the DVP (Delivery Versus Payment) principle. Most currency market members work on KASE in the mode of immediate delivery of tenge and foreign currency. New currency market members and (or) particular banks prone to risks are required to pre-deliver the currency being sold.

The banks acting as correspondents of KASE are:

- National bank of the Republic of Kazakhstan (KZT);
- Deutsche Bank Trust Company Americas (USD);
- The Bank of New York Mellon (USD);
- Citibank N.A. (USD, EUR);
- Commerzbank AG (EUR);
- Sberbank of Russia (RUB);
- Bank of China (CNY).

KASE's currency market plays an important role in Kazakhstan's economy. In recent years, its share in the total turnover on Kazakhstan's interbank currency market has been between 50 and 83%. This is where the average-weighted USD/KZT exchange rate is fixed, which is used as the official exchange rate by the National Bank of the Republic of Kazakhstan the next day.

=== Securities market ===
==== Government securities ====
This sector features bonds issued by the Ministry of Finance and the National Bank of the Republic of Kazakhstan as well as by local executive authorities. All municipal bonds and bonds of the Ministry of Finance are offered in KASE trading system. The National Bank offers its notes independently.

In recent years, there have been at least 200 government securities worth a total of about US$1.7 billion in constant circulation on KASE.

==== Equity securities ====
Today, this sector trades financial instruments of over 80 issuers, mainly stocks of local and foreign companies. The total shares market capitalization makes up more than US$42.5 billion. The main bulk of the market is occupied by companies from mining, energy and financial sectors.

==== Corporate debt securities ====
There are around 288 corporate bonds listing on KASE issued by more than 75 domestic and foreign companies in accordance with Kazakh and foreign legislations. The total amount of debt available for trade on KASE is valued at approximately US$300 million. The official list is dominated by bonds issued by banks. Companies from other sectors form an insignificant share.

==== Settlements on the securities market ====
All settlements on securities transactions on KASE are executed by the Central Securities Depository (CSD) in the "transaction after transaction" mode on the day of transaction conclusion (using the T+0 scheme with full advance payment). The DVP principle is applied and prior to making a transaction, the money and securities which are the subject of the transaction should be in the CSD's accounts.

In order to increase the effectiveness of the stock market's settlement infrastructure and to attract foreign investors on to KASE, the Exchange is working along several lines. They include the introduction to the securities market of the multilateral net clearing and settlements using the Т+n (0<n<4) settlement scheme with partial securing of transactions and a modern system of risk management. This system is based on the use of margining and special clearing (guarantee and reserve) funds.

=== Repo transactions market ===
One of the largest segments of KASE is the repo transactions market, which traditionally accounts for almost half of the total volume of exchange trading. It features two sectors: the "nego" repo market where deals are carried by way of direct (negotiable) transactions and the "auto" repo market. In the latter case, the question is about the anonymous trades using the order-driven market method in which Kazakhstan's tenge is offered, and the repo interest rate means the price. The terms of the repo transactions are standard.

Government and corporate securities may be the subject of repo transactions on KASE.

The risk management system in the automatic repo market is based on limiting the term of the repo transactions to thirty days and binding the repo item to the market price. Should the closing transaction fail, the repo item will stay with the party to the transaction who gave money. In the "nego" repo market, where the term is limited to 90 days, the system of regular market revaluation of obligations and compensations ("mark-to-market") has been in place since 2010.

All settlements are made through the CSD using the same scheme as the one used to settle securities trades.

=== Derivatives market ===
In 2010, KASE instituted a reset of the derivatives market using a modern risk management system which meets international standards. This sector has opened trade in three-month and six-month futures on USD/KZT rate and on the KASE Index. The Exchange acts as the central counteragent for each transaction being concluded and ensures unconditional execution of transactions within amounts of reserve and guarantee funds. Limits were set for both open position and price change for the purpose of minimizing settlement risks.

Since February 1, 2012 a new unit, the Clearing department, has been operating on the Exchange. Based on results of a trading day the Clearing department executes clearing using multi-party netting and generates a report on net liabilities/net claims of clearing participants.

== Exchange services ==
=== Listing on KASE ===
KASE listing requirements are governed by a normative legal act of the authorized body.

The Exchange's internal documents establish the procedure and time frames for considering applications for inclusion of securities in the official list, procedures for de-listing of securities, transfer from one category of the list to another, requirements for disclosing information, procedures for payment of listing fees, as well as other listing requirements and procedures.

==== Requirements for information disclosure ====
KASE has established requirements for disclosing information during preparation for the listing of securities and while those securities are officially listed on the Exchange. These requirements are applicable to:

- documents submitted for purposes of undergoing a listing of securities, as well as applicable to the content of the investment memorandum which contains essential information about the issuer's activities and its securities as well as an analysis of his financial position;
- financial statements of the issuer and the auditor's report on these financial statements;
- the disclosure of any other pertinent information concerning the current activities of the issuer and its securities.

More detailed information about these requirements is in the Listing Rules, published on KASE website.

==== Listing procedure ====
Listing procedure on KASE includes a check of the issuer and its securities for compliance with the listing requirements established by the authorized body and internal documents of the Exchange; it is carried out based on documents and information submitted to the Exchange.

The decision to officially list a company's securities is made by the Listing Commission.

After the issuer's securities have been included in the Exchange's official list, trade in the securities should be opened within three months after the date of their inclusion.

The legislation of the Republic of Kazakhstan stipulates a system of tax benefits to attract investors to the organized securities market. In particular, the tax payer has the right to a reduced taxable income for the following types of income:

- interest received on debt securities that on the date of the interest accrual are included in the official list of a stock exchange operating in Kazakhstan;
- capital gains earned on securities listed on a stock exchange operating in Kazakhstan on the day of their selling at offering of those securities by a public auction method on that exchange;
- dividends and interest received on securities listed on a stock exchange operating in Kazakhstan on the day of their accrual.

=== KASE indices and market indicators ===
KASE is characterized by a set of indicators which are calculated and published by the Exchange in real time mode as well as at the end of a trading day.

==== KASE index ====
Composite index weighted by market capitalization which is calculated according to prices of transactions in the most liquid shares on KASE. The index is calculated in real time after each trade is executed.

==== Corporate bond market indices ====
This sector of the stock market is characterized by three indicators:

- KASE_BY– indicator of profitability of corporate bonds;
- KASE_BP – corporate bond price index with interest accrued;
- KASE_BC – corporate bond price index without interest accrued.

Indices for the corporate bond market are calculated based on the results of each trading day.

==== Capitalization of the corporate bond market ====
Shares market capitalization is an indicator that reflects the combined market value of companies whose shares are listed on KASE.

Capitalization of corporate bond market is the combined face value of outstanding corporate bonds listed on KASE.

Calculation of the share market and corporate bond market capitalization is carried out by the Exchange in tenge and US dollars based on the results of each trading day.

==== Repo market indicators ====
The TONIA (Tenge OverNight Index Average) and TWINA (Tenge Week Index Average) are weighted average interest rates on opening repo transactions in Kazakh tenge on the automatic repo market. The TONIA indicator reflects the cost of money on overnight repos while the TWINA on repo – for seven days. Underlying assets of repo transactions are Kazakhstan government securities. The indicators are calculated in real time upon the conclusion of each opening nego repo transaction in government securities.

==== Interbank deposits market indicators ====
KazPrime is an indicator reflecting the interest rates on Kazakh tenge put in three-month interbank deposits among Kazakh banks with the highest local credit rating. The indicator's fixing occurs at 11:30 Almaty time and within 30 minutes afterwards every signatory of the indicator formation agreement must conclude transactions using quotations he offered, if so requested by the other signatories.

In addition to the KazPrime indicator, the interbank deposit market is characterized by the KIBOR, KIBID, KIMEAN indicators:

- KIBOR – average value of offering rates for the Kazakh tenge;
- KIBID – average values for bid rates for the Kazakh tenge;
- KIMEAN – average values between offering and bid rates.

Fixing of these indicators is performed by the Exchange at 16:00 Almaty time. Unlike KazPrime quotes used to calculate the indicators are indicative and do not bind banks to perform transactions based on them.

On November 30, 2011, the leading global supplier of indices, the Dow Jones Indexes, and FEAS launched the first index of "blue chips" quoted at Euro-Asian stock exchanges – equal-weighted index Dow Jones FEAS Titans 50. Kazakhstan is represented in that index by common shares of Halyk Savings Bank of Kazakhstan JSC, Kazkommertsbank JSC and KazMunaiGas Exploration Production JSC, whose weight in the index basket made up 2.07%, 1.85% and 1.91% accordingly as at the beginning of August 2011. Since the index is equally weighted and the weight of each share is limited to two per cent, in total the portion of Kazakh companies' shares in the index made up around 6%. These shares are part of KASE Index's representative list, as well as part of representative lists of indices Dow Jones FEAS Benchmark and S&P Kazakhstan BMI.

In December 2011 KASE joined the agreement between Standard & Poor's Financial Services LLC ("S&P") and exchanges from member countries of the Organization of Islamic Cooperation. Under the agreement S&P intends to calculate, license and distribute in real time the index composed of 50 liquid shares ("S&P Index") traded on exchange markets of countries participating in the Organization of Islamic Cooperation.

==== KASE information ====
KASE distributes information generated by the Exchange and provided by its partners (issuers, members of the Exchange, etc.). Conventionally, exchange information can be divided into:

- data on exchange trading;
- information about exchange indices and indicators;
- documents of issuers whose securities have been admitted to circulation on KASE as well as other pertinent information;
- information on membership and KASE members;
- data on financial instruments admitted included in KASE lists;
- regulatory framework relating to government regulation of the exchange market as well as KASE internal documents;
- news about the securities market and KASE itself.

KASE information is distributed primarily through the Exchange's website. The website is currently available in Kazakh, Russian and English languages. It is one of the largest sources of information about Kazakhstan's regulated securities market and it is the only resource for disclosing information about the activities of all listed companies. The website contains archived KASE news for the past 13 years, located in a section accessible to the public, as well as provides users with access to KASE trade information in real time, with 15 minute delays, and with daily trade totals.

In addition, the Exchange provides trade information in real time via:

- KASE trading system terminals
- data transmission using the FIX protocol to secondary disseminators of information, including Thomson Reuters and Bloomberg;
- direct mailing to interested persons in specified formats, protocols, and channels of communication.

==== KASE trading system ====
In 1997, KASE developed and launched its own trading system that is comparable to its peers developed by specialized companies. In order to improve the performance of the trading system, revisions and updates are regularly carried out (an updated edition is released on average 3-4 times a year).

Trading is conducted daily (except for holidays and days-off).

KASE trading system allows trades in the following ways:

- order-driven market (primary method of trade);
- direct (contractual) transactions;
- specialized trades (auctions);
- Frankfurt auction;
- fixing;
- subscription (during share offerings).

Remote access to KASE trading system is accomplished through dedicated channels from Kazakhstan's leading providers and via the Internet.

==== Online trading on KASE ====
KASE provides access to online trading through the following software products:

1. STrade is a modern, fast and convenient online trading terminal for individuals using a special Transit Order Transmission Mechanism (TOTM) and the digital signature (EDS) that conforms to Kazakhstan's Standard 34.310-2004 A;
2. a module for exchange of information with the trading system that allows third-party online trading programs to connect to the KASE trading system in order to receive information in real time and submit orders;
3. transactional FIX-gateway developed on the basis of the international standard of market data transmission, the Fix-protocol, with features similar to those of the information exchange module.

==== Corporate governance on KASE ====
KASE has been permanently improving and developing its corporate governance system in order to protect the interests of shareholders, issuers, Exchange members and investors.

The Exchange's governing body – the Board of Directors (Exchange Council) – currently comprises 4 independent directors; this body features 4 committees:

- on budget and strategic planning;
- on personnel, remuneration and social issues;
- on audit;
- on financial statements and issuer audit.

To enable collegial decision-making and to avoid conflicts of interests additional working committees were set up at the Exchange, composed not only of Exchange employees, but also of representatives of the authorized body and market participants.

According to requirements set by the authorized body, a permanent compliance control to detect insider deals, fraudulent transactions is carried out. Systems of risk management and internal control consistent with international standards have been set up.

== KASE subsidiaries ==
- IRBIS Financial Markets Informational Agency, LLP – collection, processing and presentation of information pertaining to the financial markets as well as exchange information, development and delivery of information products and rendering of specialized services;
- eTrade.kz, LLP – development, support and modification of software for the needs of KASE; provides services to KASE and other entities in the field of information technology;
- RTRS, LLP – setting up and maintenance of the backup trade center.

== See also ==
- Economy of Kazakhstan
- List of stock exchanges
- List of European stock exchanges
