= Marat Abiyev =

Kazakh businessman

Marat Zhaksylykuly Abiyev
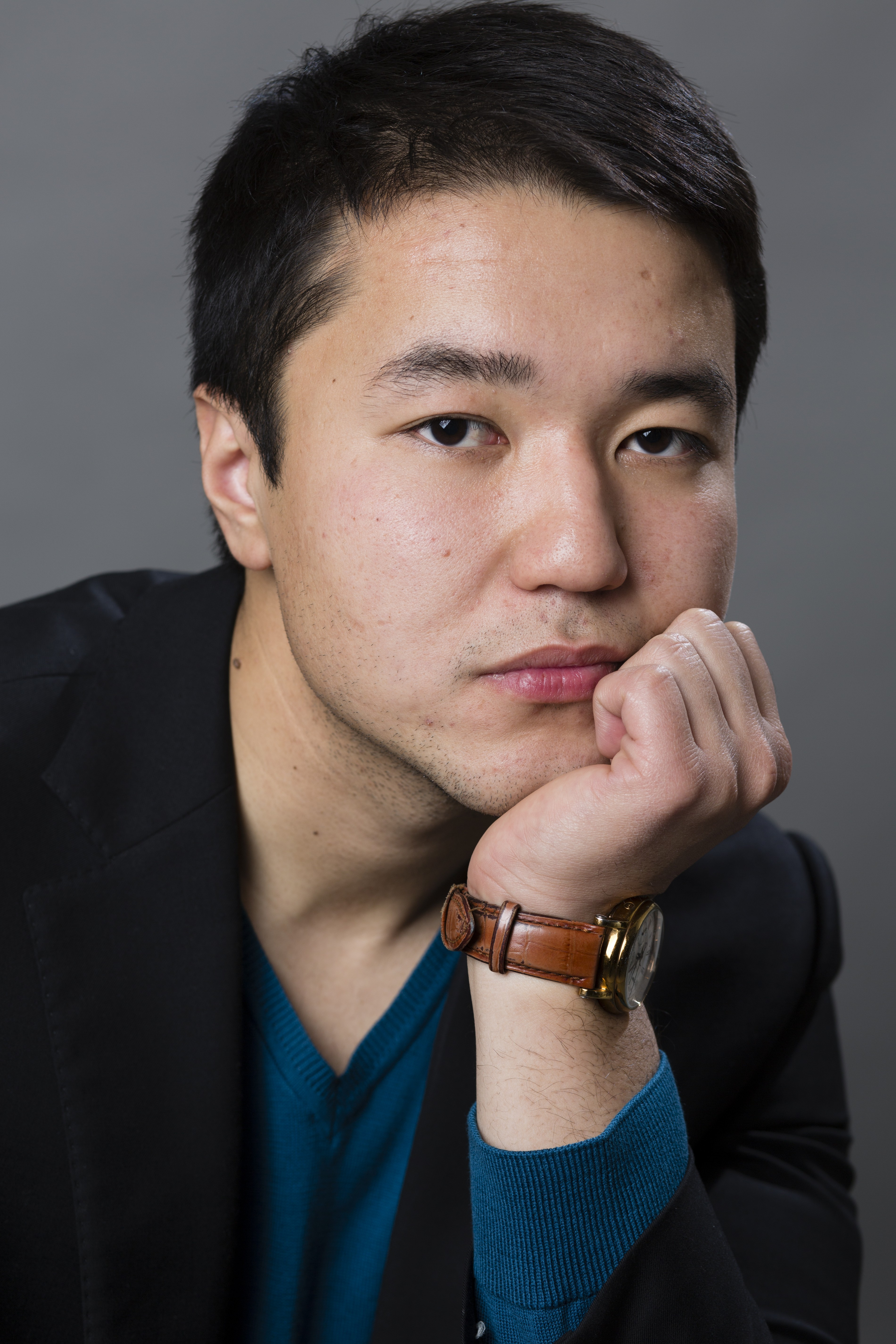
- Born: September 6, 1989 (age 36); Kandyagash, Aktobe Region, Republic of Kazakhstan
- Citizenship: Republic of Kazakhstan
- Occupations: Businessman, writer
- Parents: Abiyev Zhaksylyk Medikhatuly; Tamara Abiyeva Asaukhankyzy

Marat Zhaksylykuly Abiyev (Kazakh: Марат Жақсылықұлы Әбиев, Marat Jaqsylyquly Ábıev; born September 6, 1989) is a Kazakh businessman, author of the Kazakhstani Dream book.

== Biography ==
Abiyev was born on September 6, in Kandyagash, Aktobe Region, Republic of Kazakhstan.

In 1999, due to the economic crisis of 1998, the Abiyev family moved to the regional center of Aktobe.

=== Family ===
Abiyev Zhaksylyk Medihatovich, the father, graduated from Kazakh Polytechnic Institute named after V.I. Lenin now called Satbayev Kazakh National Technical University, majoring in machinery and equipment for Oil and Gas Industry. He worked with such organizations as: Aktobe oil exploration, geophysical expedition in the position of a diesel engineman; Oktyabrskoe Drilling Operations Institution in the positions of a mechanic and shop superintendent; Central Operational Support Base in the position of the chief engineer; TOO KKBK Velikaya Stena in the position of the shop superintendent; In recent years he worked as the deputy commander for operations at the VPFO Ak Beren Central Headquarters Professional Uniformed Emergency Services State Enterprise in the rank of lieutenant colonel.

Abiyeva Tamara Asauhanovna, the mother, is a teacher at the university on the Architecture and building construction course, the Kazakh SSR chess champion.

Zhaksylyk Marzhangul Zhaksylykovna, a sister, is a full-time student at Kazakh Humanities and Law Institute of the Ministry of Justice of the Republic of Kazakhstan (KAZGUU).

After graduating from high school, he entered the Aktobe Cooperative College majoring in automated systems for information processing and management. He graduated from Aktobe Cooperative College in 2009.

In 2002 he started working in network marketing.

From 2003 to 2005 he was a producer of various Aktobe's rap bands.

In 2007 M.Z. Abiyev started working as an entrepreneur. He started two companies, one called W and the other one called IT-outsourcing. The W company was a web-based studio which was engaged in creation, design, and maintenance of websites. It was one of the first companies in the Aktobe region offering website services. W Web Studio won the Best in the service sector medal-award. The company offered full and partial support of the activity, as well as the maintenance and modernization of IT infrastructure of various companies.

The establishment of the Association of Producers of Kazakhstan association of legal entities was initiated by him in 2012. The main mission of the Association is to "protect and promote domestic producers."

Abiyev is also the founder of various companies in the UK and the Russian Federation. Some of these companies are engaged in the sale of goods produced in the Republic of Kazakhstan. Others are involved in international trade for the supply of the metal, food and medical equipment to the Islamic Republic of Iran from the United Kingdom, the Russian Federation, Turkey, People's Republic of China and Belarus.

== Bibliography ==
- "Kazakhstan's Dream" (2013)

== Notes ==
- Kapital.kz Business Portal named Abiyev Marat person of the year in 2013. The following people have also been named person of 2013: Nursultan Nazarbayev, Grigory Marchenko, Kenges Rakishev and Mikhail Lomtadze.
