= Ruslan Dälenov =

Kazakh politician (born 1975)

- Руслан Дәленов
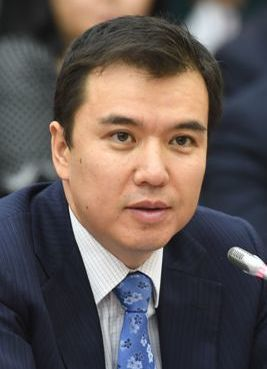
- Dälenov in 2017

Minister of National Economy
- In office 25 February 2019 – 18 January 2021
- President: Nursultan Nazarbayev; Kassym-Jomart Tokayev
- Prime Minister: Askar Mamin
- Preceded by: Timur Suleimenov
- Succeeded by: Aset Ergaliev

Personal details
- Born: 8 February 1975 (age 51) Tselinograd, Kazakh SSR, Soviet Union
- Party: Nur Otan
- Spouse: Janara Dalenova
- Children: 3
- Education: Marmara University

Ruslan Erbolatuly Dälenov (Kazakh: Руслан Ерболатұлы Дәленов, Ruslan Erbolatūly Dälenov; born 8 February 1975) is a Kazakh politician who served as a Minister of National Economy from 25 February 2019 to 18 January 2021.

== Biography ==
=== Early life and education ===
Dälenov was born in Tselinograd (now Astana). In 1999, he graduated from Marmara University with a degree in economics.

=== Career ===
Dälenov began his professional career at the Ministry of State Revenue, starting as a leading specialist. In 2003, he became the Head of the Department for Analysis and Current Forecasting of Incomes of the Tax Committee of the Ministry of Finance. From September 2003 to January 2005, Dälenov was the Director of the Income Analysis Department of the Ministry of Finance of Kazakhstan. In 2008, he was appointed as the Vice Minister of Finance and from April 2017, he served as the First Vice Minister of National Economy.

On 25 February 2019, by the Decree of the President, he was appointed as the Minister of National Economy. Dälenov served the post until being dismissed on 18 January 2021.

== Honours ==
Ribbon bar	Honour	Date and comment
	Order of Kurmet	5 December 2018
	For contribution to the creation Eurasian Economic Community, 2nd degree	8 May 2015
	Eren Eŋbeg Üşın	2012
	20 years of the Independence of the Republic of Kazakhstan	2011
	10 years of Astana	2008
