= Kazakhstan Deposit Insurance Fund =

- Type: Joint Stock Company
- Founded: 1999
- Headquarters: 136 Dostyk Avenue, "Pioneer-3" Business Center, 8 floor, Almaty 050051, Republic of Kazakhstan
- Key people: Baimagambetov A.M. (Chairman, since May 2019)
- Services: Deposit Insurance
- Parent: National Bank of the Republic of Kazakhstan
- Website: www.kdif.kz

The Kazakhstan Deposit Insurance Fund (KDIF; Kazakh: Қазақстанның депозиттерге кепілдік беру қоры, romanized: Qazaqstannıñ depozïtterge kepildik berw qorı, lit. 'Deposit Guarantee Fund of Kazakhstan') is a non-profit organization that guarantees deposits of individuals (including individual entrepreneurs) and placed with second-tier banks of the Republic of Kazakhstan. The basic objective of the mandatory deposit insurance system is to maintain stability of the financial system in the Republic of Kazakhstan, including strengthening public confidence in the Kazakhstani banking system via reimbursing depositors in the event of a deposit insurance system member bank failure.

The governing laws and regulations are laws of the Republic of Kazakhstan “On banks and banking activity” (1995) and Law of the Republic of Kazakhstan “On mandatory insurance of deposits placed with the second-tier banks of the Republic of Kazakhstan” (2006).

KDIF was established in 1999. The Sole Shareholder and the founding organization of the KDIF is National Bank of the Republic of Kazakhstan.

== Deposit Insurance System ==
In accordance with the Deposit Insurance Law of 2006, the deposit insurance system has the following features:

- Compulsory membership for banks that hold licenses for cash transactions and opening and maintenance of bank accounts of individuals,

- Transparency,

- Mitigation of risks associated with operations,

- Accumulative basis of generation of the special reserve fund for payouts.

== Mission, Mandate and Powers ==
Mission of KDIF is to maintain public confidence in Kazakhstani financial system and its stability as one of the financial safety net organizations by insuring deposits of individuals and encouraging member banks to conduct their operations with prudence and responsibility.

The strategic objectives are: - Sound corporate governance - Operational preparedness for bank failures - Enhanced public awareness of the National deposit insurance system - Continuing professional development opportunities for staff. The key functions of the Fund are: - to reimburse depositors in the event of forced liquidation of a member bank, - to maintain and publish a to-date register of member banks, - investment management, - to accumulate special reserve for payouts, - to select the agent bank for payouts, - to act as a party of temporary administration of a bank in conservatorship or in period of withdrawal of the licenses for banking operations, - to act as a party of the liquidation commission and the creditor committee as long as the claim of the Fund has been unsettled, and other civil functions.

== Scope of Coverage and Maximum Coverage Limit ==
In Kazakhstan, membership in deposit insurance system is compulsory for those banks which hold license for cash transactions and opening and maintenance of bank accounts of individuals, except for Islamic banks;. As of August 2019, 26 out of total 28 banks are members of deposit insurance system.

The scope of coverage are bank accounts of individuals and individual entrepreneurs of all types with resident banks in the Republic of Kazakhstan in any currency. On the per-depositor-per-bank basis, the maximum deposit coverage limit for all deposits and bank accounts of individuals shall amount to:

savings deposits in the national currency: 15 million tenge, other deposits in the national currency: 10 million tenge, deposits in any foreign currency: 5 million tenge (in equivalent, at the currency exchange rate established as of the date of the enactment of the court's decision on the member-bank's forced liquidation). Should a depositor have 2 or more deposits allocated with one and the same bank in both national and in foreign currency, this depositor shall be reimbursed in the total amount up to 15 million tenge.

== The Reimbursement Cases ==
As of August 2019, there have been 7 cases of bank failures and reimbursing depositors in Kazakhstan. Payouts to depositors of the banks has amounted to approximately 76 billion Kazakhstan tenge.

== International cooperation ==
KDIF has maintained membership in the International Association of Deposit Insurers since 2003.
