= Grigori Marchenko =

Kazakh financier, banker and politician (born 1959)

- Григорий Марченко
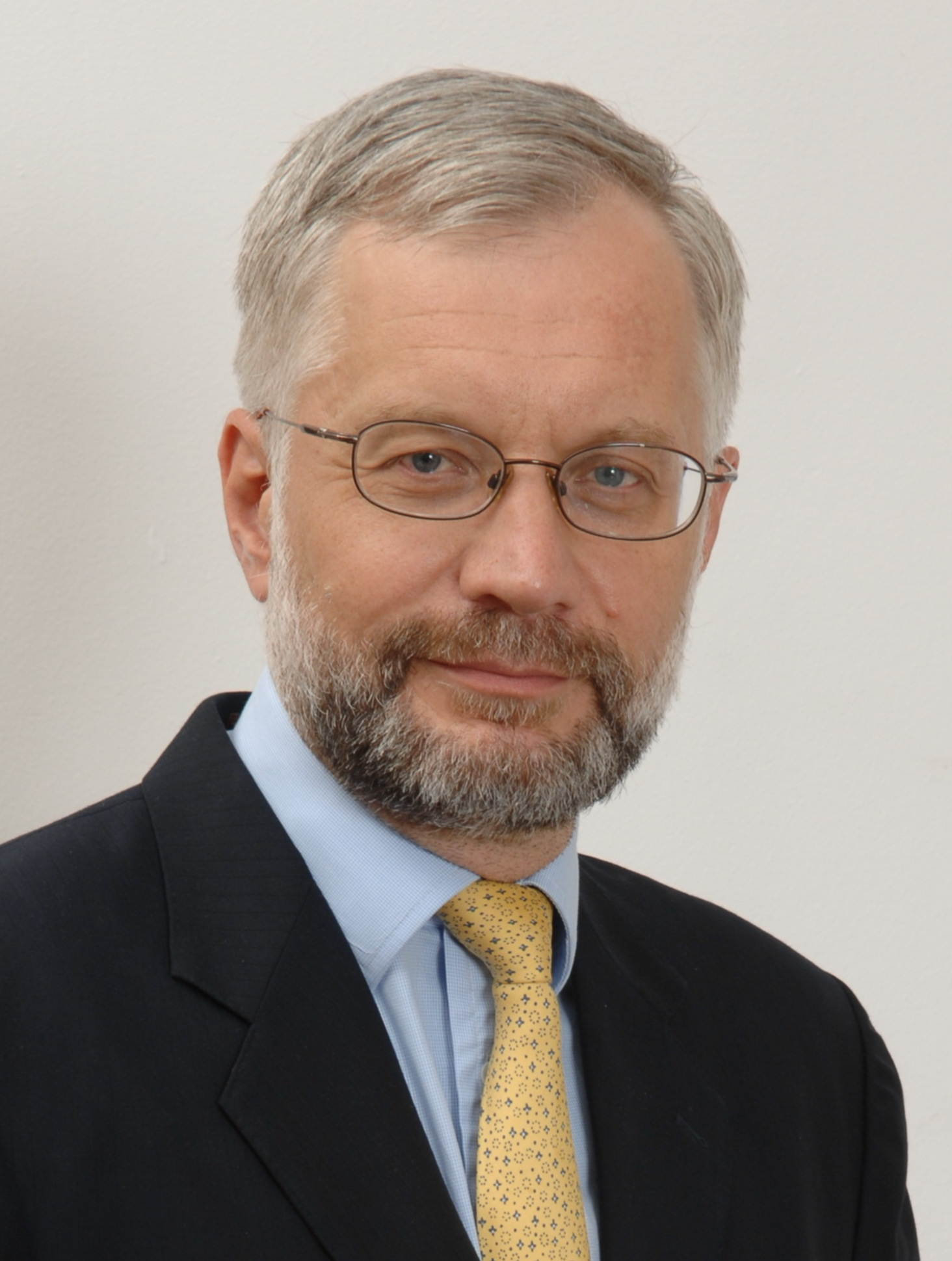
- Marchenko in 2007

First Deputy Prime Minister of Kazakhstan
- In office 6 January 2004 – 14 April 2004
- Prime Minister: Daniyal Akhmetov
- Preceded by: Aleksandr Pavlov
- Succeeded by: Umirzak Shukeyev (2009)

Chairman of the National Bank of Kazakhstan
- In office 22 January 2009 – 1 October 2013
- Preceded by: Anvar Saidenov
- Succeeded by: Kairat Kelimbetov
- In office 12 October 1999 – 6 January 2004
- Preceded by: Kadyrzhan Damitov
- Succeeded by: Anvar Saidenov

Personal details
- Born: 26 December 1959 (age 66) Alma-Ata, Kazakh SSR, Soviet Union
- Education: MGIMO

Grigory Alexandrovich Marchenko (Russian: Григорий Александрович Марченко; born 26 December 1959) is a Kazakh financier, banker, and politician.

Marchenko was the chairman of the executive board and CEO of Halyk Bank. He served as the First Deputy Prime Minister of Kazakhstan in 2004. He is the honorary consul of the Singaporean Government to the Kazakh government since 3 November 2006 as well as the honorary consul of the Kingdom of Spain in Almaty.

He won Euromoney's 2003 Central Bank Governor of the year award. He also was chosen as the Best financier of the year ("the Choice of 2000 of the Republic of Kazakhstan", "the Choice of 2005 of the Republic of Kazakhstan"). He was awarded with a breastplate "Honoured Employee of the National Bank of Kazakhstan" in 2012.

He was twice the chairman of the National Bank of Kazakhstan: from 1999 to 2004 and from 2009 to 2013.

== Education and career ==
He graduated from the Moscow State Institute of International Relations in 1984. He studied at Georgetown University in Washington D.C., United States in 1994.

Marchenko served as a deputy governor from 1994 to 1996 at Kazakhstan's National Bank, the country's central bank. After that he worked as a head of the National Commission on Securities from 1996 to 1997, then as a CEO of the Deutsche Bank Securities (Kazakhstan) from May 1998 until October 1999. He was the non-staff advisor of the president of the Republic of Kazakhstan from October 1997 until October 1999. Thereafter, he returned as a governor to the National Bank of Kazakhstan, the position he held from October 1999 till January 2004. He worked as the first deputy prime minister of the Republic of Kazakhstan from January 2004 until April 2004. He was elected as a chairman of the board at a joint-stock company "Halyk bank of Kazakhstan", the position he held from January 2005 until January 2009 before being appointed a second time as the governor of the National Bank of Kazakhstan on 22 January 2009. Furthermore, he resigned from the position of the governor of the National Bank on October, 1st 2013.

== Development ==
Marchenko gave a speech on "The development of Kazakhstan in the period of Globalization and the growth of financial markets" on 15 March 2006 at the Hong Kong Theatre, Clement House, Aldwych, for the London School of Economics.

In 2011 Grigori Marchenko was put forward as a possible head of the International Monetary Fund by the leaders of governments of the Commonwealth of Independent States association of former Soviet republics. He first heard of his candidacy by text message on the day it was agreed at a meeting of the Commonwealth of Independent States. However, later he has pulled out of the race to run the International Monetary Fund.

== OSI/CSIS Conference ==
On 12 May 2003 Marchenko held a speech entitled "Caspian Oil Windfall: Who Will Benefit?" at a conference in Washington D.C. that the Open Society Institute and the Center for Strategic and International Studies sponsored. In his speech, he defended the National Fund of Kazakhstan's management of revenues from Kazakhstan's petroleum production, and he criticized a book published by the OSI with the same title as his speech referring, in particular, to 40 factual "mistakes" found by him in said book.

Marchenko specifically took issue with the allegations that the Kazakhstan Government established the fund on a questionable legal basis, citing 30 amendments to several laws passed by the Parliament regarding financial accountability, the fact that President Nursultan Nazarbayev has complete control over the fund, calling it "simply wrong" that the book refers to "the Russian Black Sea port of Ceyhan" which is in fact a Turkish port, but not, as asserted in the book, a Russian port. In conclusion, Marchenko proposed "that the book be recalled, and the chapter on Kazakhstan be rewritten." George Soros invited Marchenko to point out the mistakes he had found and undertook that these mistakes would be corrected.

Marchenko met with Russian president Vladimir Putin and Putin's economic advisor Andrei Ilarianov, in May 2003. After the meeting there were rumours in the media that Putin had offered Marchenko a job in the Central Bank of the Russian Federation.
