= Timur Suleimenov =

Kazakh politician (born 1978)

- Тимур Сүлейменов
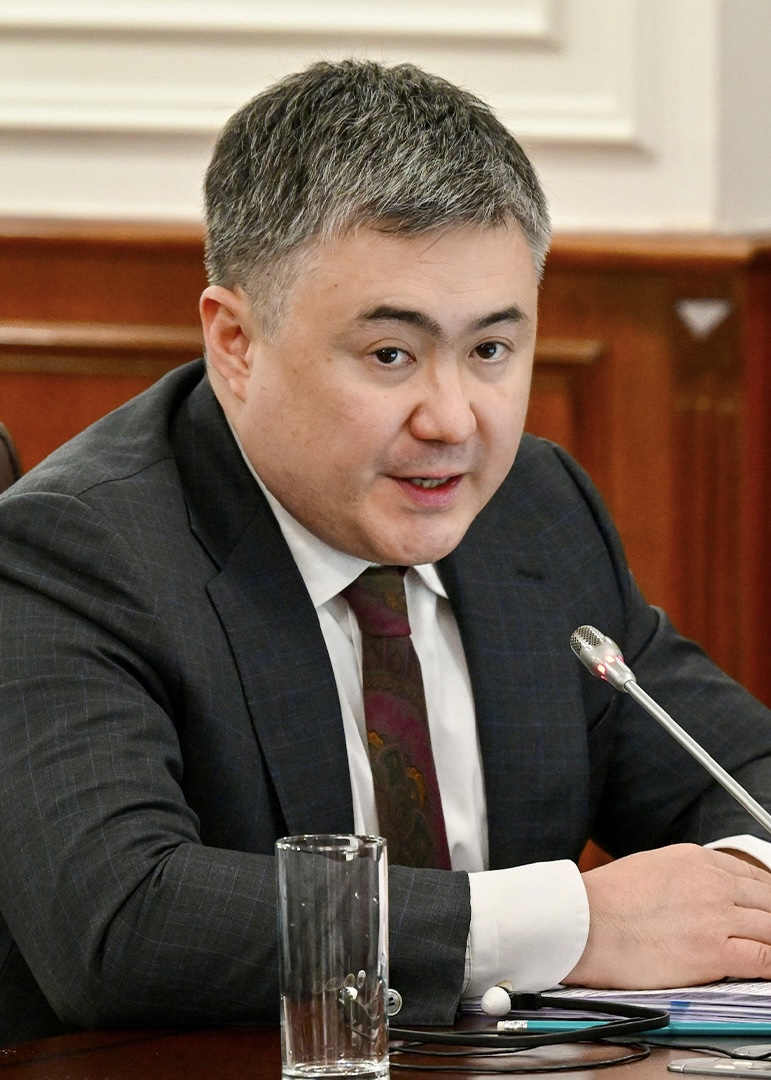
- Suleimenov in 2026

Chairman of National Bank of Kazakhstan
- Incumbent
- Assumed office 4 September 2023
- President: Kassym-Jomart Tokayev
- Preceded by: Galymjan Pirmatov

Minister of National Economy
- In office 28 December 2016 – 25 February 2019
- President: Nursultan Nazarbayev
- Prime Minister: Bakhytzhan Sagintayev; Askar Mamin (Acting)
- Preceded by: Quandyq Bishimbaev
- Succeeded by: Ruslan Dälenov

Minister of Economy and Financial Policy of the Eurasian Economic Commission
- In office 1 February 2012 – 14 April 2017
- Preceded by: Office established
- Succeeded by: Timur Jaqsylyqov

Personal details
- Born: 5 April 1978 (age 48) Kazakh SSR
- Spouse: Danara Suleimenova
- Children: 4
- Education: Pavlodar State University; Robert H. Smith School of Business

Timur Mūratūly Süleimenov (Note: Often transliterated as Timur Muratovich Suleymenov through a Russified Romanization of Тимур Муратович Сулейменов.) (Kazakh: Тимур Мұратұлы Сүлейменов; 5 April 1978) is a Kazakh politician and economist serving as chairman of National Bank since 2023. He previously served as Minister of National Economy from 2016 to 2029 and Minister of Economy and Financial Policy of the Eurasian Economic Commission from 2012 to 2017.

== Biography ==
=== Early life and education ===
Born in the Kazakh SSR, In 2000, Suleimenov graduated from Pavlodar State University with a degree in management. After that, having entered the Bolashaq scholarship at the Robert H. Smith School of Business in the University of Maryland, he earned degree there in 2002 in economics.

=== Career ===
Suleimenov started his professional career at Ernst & Young Kazakhstan. After that, he was the director of the Tax Accounting and Tax Planning Department at the KazMunayGas Exploration Production company.

In March 2009, he was appointed as Vice Minister of Economy and Budget Planning, and in 2010, as the Vice Minister of Economic Development and Trade. On 1 February 2012, he became a member of the Board, Minister for Economy and Financial Policy of the Eurasian Economic Commission.

On 28 December 2016, by the Decree of the President of Kazakhstan, Suleimenov was appointed as Minister of National Economy. After being relieved from his post on 25 February 2019, he then became the deputy chairman of National Bank of Kazakhstan on 2 March 2019.

On 22 March 2019, Suleimenov was appointed as assistant to the President of Kazakhstan. Where he worked until becoming the deputy head of the Presidential Administration of Kazakhstan on 22 July 2019. From 6 February 2020, he headed the Center for Analysis and Monitoring of Socio-Economic Reforms under the Presidential Administration.

On September 4, 2023, presidentKassym-Jomart Tokayev nominated Timur Suleimenov as governor of National Bank, after which the Senate unanimously approved his candidacy within two minutes. Following the adoption of a new Constitution in 2026, which vested the president with sole authority to appoint the National Bank governor, Tokayev reappointed Suleimenov to the position on August 24, 2026.
