= Ministry of National Economy (Kazakhstan) =

Government ministry of Kazakhstan

Ministry of National Economy of the Republic of Kazakhstan
- Қазақстан Республикасы Ұлттық экономика министрлігі
- Emblem of Kazakhstan

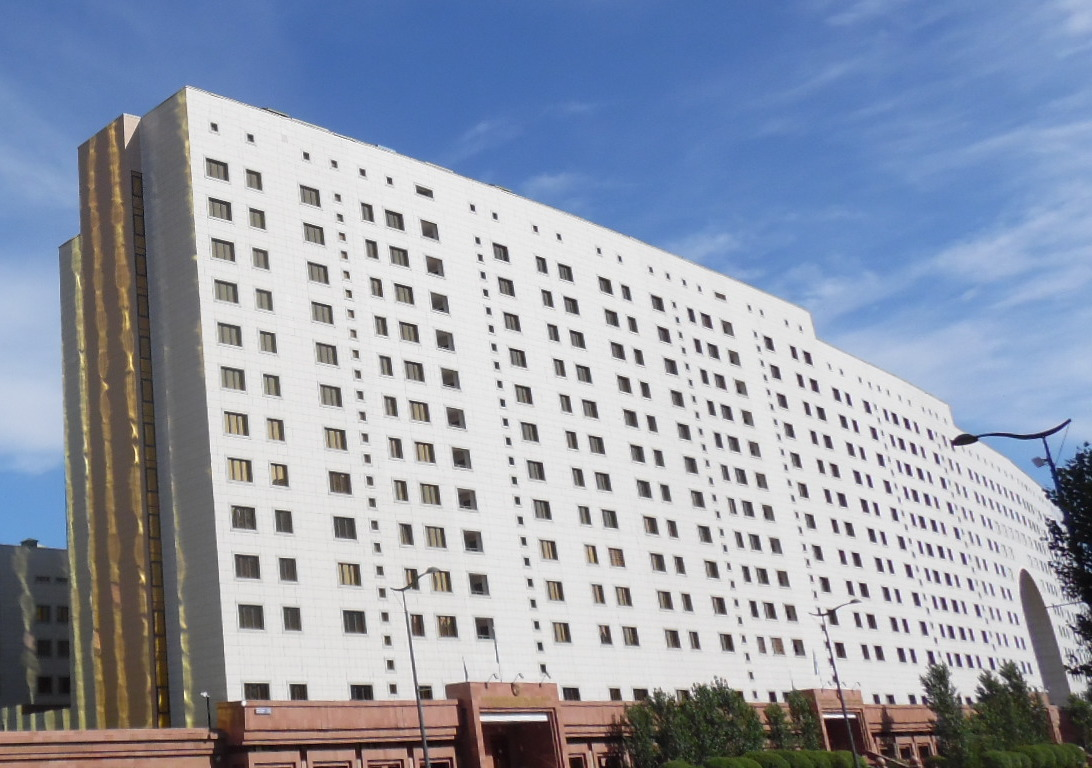
- House of Ministries

Agency overview
- Formed: 11 January 1993; 33 years ago
- Jurisdiction: Government of Kazakhstan
- Headquarters: Astana, Kazakhstan
- Agency executive: Serik Jumanğarin, Minister
- Website: Official website

The Ministry of National Economy of the Republic of Kazakhstan (MNE RK, Kazakh: Қазақстан Республикасы Ұлттық экономика министрлігі, ҚР ҰЭМ, Qazaqstan Respublikasy Ūlttyq iekonomika ministrlıgı, QR ŪİeM; Russian: Министерство национальной экономики Республики Казахстан, МНЭ РК) is central executive body of the Government of Kazakhstan, which administers in the areas of strategic planning, tax and budgetary policies, as well as customs policy, state and state-guaranteed borrowing and debt, public-private partnerships, state investment projects, protection of competition and restriction of monopolistic activities, natural monopolies and regulated markets, international economic and financial relations.

The Ministry is also responsible for regulating international economic integration, regulating and developing foreign trade activities, regulating trade activities, managing public assets, including improving the quality of corporate governance, developing the public administration system, developing public policies in the provision of public services, mobilization training and mobilization, population migration, state material reserve.

== History ==
The state body was originally established in January 1993 as the Ministry of Economy. The Ministry of Economy and Budget Planning was formed on 28 August 2002 in accordance with the Decree 931 by the President of Kazakhstan "On Measures to Further Improve the Public Administration of the Republic of Kazakhstan" by merging the functions of economic planning from the Ministry of Economy and Trade and budget planning from the Ministry of Finance. On 16 January 2013, the Ministry of Economic Development and Trade in accordance with the Decree of the President of the Republic of Kazakhstan "On further improvement of the public administration system of the Republic of Kazakhstan" was reorganized into the Ministry of Economy and Budget Planning. On 6 August 2014, during the reorganization, the Ministry of National Economy replaced the Ministry of Economy and Budget Planning of Kazakhstan and the Ministry of Regional Development of Kazakhstan, it also includes the functions of the reorganized agencies: statistics, regulation of natural monopolies, protection of competition, protection of consumer rights.

== Departments ==
- Department of Summary and Analytical Work (Secretariat of the Minister)
- Department of State Support for Entrepreneurship
- Information Protection Department
- Human Resources Department
- Department of Information Technology
- Department of Social Policy and Development of State Bodies
- Investment Policy Department
- Project Management Department
- Department of Analysis and Assessment of Regions
- Regional Development Department
- Department of Internal Administration
- Public Relations Department
- Legal Department
- Department of Public Administration System Development
- Entrepreneurship Development Department
- Trade Regulation Department
- Foreign Trade Development Department
- Department of State Assets Management Policy
- Department of International Economic Integration
- Department of International Cooperation
- Department of Government Commitments Management Policy and Financial Sector Development
- Department of Development of Sectors of the Economy
- Department of Strategic Planning and Analysis
- Department of Economics and Finance
- Department of budgetary policy
- Department of Tax and Customs Policy
- Department of Macroeconomic Analysis and Forecasting
- Internal Audit Department

== Committees ==
- Committee of Statistics
- Committee for Regulation of Natural Monopolies, Protection of Competition and Consumer Rights

== Subordinate organizations ==
- Information and Computing Center of the Agency on Statistics

== Ministers ==
Name	Tenure
Mars Ürkimbazhev	February — September 1994
Altai Tileuberdin	October 1994 — November 1995
Umirzak Shukeyev	13 November 1995 – 10 October 1997
Zhaksybek Kulekeyev	13 October 1999 — January 2002
Mazhit Yesenbazhev	January — August 2002
Kairat Kelimbetov	28 August 2002 – 18 April 2006
Karim Massimov	20 April 2006 – 13 October 2006
Aslan Musin	6 October 2006 – 10 August 2007
Bakhyt Sultanov	10 August 2007 – 12 March 2010
Zhanar Aitzhanova	12 March 2010 – 8 April 2011
Kairat Kelimbetov	11 April 2011 — 20 January 2012
Bakhytzhan Sagintayev	20 January 2012 — 24 September 2012
Erbolat Dosaev	25 September 2012 — 5 May 2016
Quandyq Bishimbaev	6 May 2016 – 28 December 2016
Timur Suleimenov	28 December 2016 – 21 February 2019
Ruslan Dälenov	25 February 2019 – 18 January 2021
Aset Irgaliyev	18 January 2021 – 5 January 2022
Alibek Kuantyrov	11 January 2022 – 5 February 2024
Nurlan Baibazarov	6 February 2024 – 21 December 2024
Serik Jumanğarin	Since 21 December 2024
