= KazMunaiGas Exploration Production =

KazMunayGas Exploration Production JSC
- Company type: public, quasisovereign
- Founded: 2004
- Headquarters: Nur-Sultan, Kazakhstan
- Key people: Kenzhebek Ibrashev (CEO)
- Products: oil natural gas
- Revenue: US$ 3.97 billion (2007) up 21.5%
- Net income: US$ 1.28 billion (2007) up 32.2%,
- Website: www.kmgep.kz

KazMunayGas Exploration Production JSC (KASE: RDGZ, LSE: KMG) is a KazMunayGas-majority-owned oil and gas company operating in the Republic of Kazakhstan.

The company explores for hydrocarbons in Mangistau, Atyrau and Kyzylorda regions of Kazakhstan and is the second largest oil producer in the country based on 2006 annual production data. In line with principles of Kazakh government's strategy in the oil and gas sector, KazMunaiGas Exploration Production has chosen to pursue inorganic growth strategy taking advantage of certain preferential rights that it has secured from KazMunayGas. Recent acquisitions of stakes in KazGerMunai and CITIC Canada Energy Limited, mid-sized oil producers in Kazakhstan, helped its stock return around 111.7% by the end of 2007 from the date of the IPO and listings on London Stock Exchange and Kazakhstan Stock Exchange.
