= Anvar Saidenov =

Russian-born Kazakh financier and banker (born 1960)

- Әнуар Сәйденов
- Born: 19 September 1960 (age 65); Moscow, Russian SFSR, Soviet Union
- Education: Moscow State University
- Occupation: Chairman of the National Bank of Kazakhstan
- Years active: 2004–2009

Anvar Galymullayevich Saidenov (Kazakh: Әнуар Ғалымоллаұлы Сәйденов, romanized: Änuar Ğalymollaūly Säidenov, born 19 September 1960) is a Kazakh financier, banker, and politician.

Saidenov is an economist, and holds a master's degree in economics and finance. He speaks Kazakh, Russian, and English. He was the chairman of the National Bank of Kazakhstan from 2004 to 2009.

In May 2022, he headed the board of directors of Alfa-Bank in the Republic of Kazakhstan.

== Biography ==
Anvar Saidenov was born on September 19, 1960, in Moscow;

In 1982, he graduated with honours in Economics from M.V. Lomonosov Moscow State University, having qualified as economist and political economy teacher;

In 1990, he defended his Ph.D. Thesis in Economics at Moscow State University;

In 1994, he graduated from the University of London with the degree of MSc in Financial Economics;

Since 1993, he has worked in financial structures;

In 1995-1996 – Special Officer of EBRD in London;

In 1996-1998 – Deputy Chairman of the National Bank of the Republic of Kazakhstan;

In 1998-1999 – Executive Director of the State Investment Committee of the Republic of Kazakhstan;

From January to August 1999 – Chairman of the Investment Agency of the Republic of Kazakhstan;

In 1999-2000 – Vice Minister of Finance of the Republic of Kazakhstan;

In 2000-2002 – chairman of the Board of Halyk Savings Bank of Kazakhstan OJSC;

From June 2002 – Deputy Chairman of the National Bank of the Republic of Kazakhstan;

From January 2004 – Acting Chairman of the National Bank of the Republic of Kazakhstan;

On January 26, 2004 – appointed as the Chairman of the National Bank of the Republic of Kazakhstan;

From March 11, 2009 – chairman of the Board of BTA Bank and Member of the Board of Directors of BTA Bank;

From August 15, 2011 – chairman of the Board of Directors of BTA Bank and Member of the Board of Directors of BTA Bank;

From December 4, 2012, to November 1, 2018 – Independent Director of Bank RBK JSC;

From January 11, 2016, to April 20, 2016 – chairman of the Board of Directors of Almaty International Airport JSC;

Since October 24, 2018 – Member of the Board of Directors - Independent Director of the Development Bank of Kazakhstan.

Since April 30, 2019 — Member of the Board of Directors, Independent Director of Bank CenterCredit.

From May 13, 2022 – chairman of the Board of Directors of Subsidiary Bank Alfa-Bank JSC in the Republic of Kazakhstan;
