= Kuandyk Bishimbayev =

Kazakh politician

- Қуандық Бишімбаев
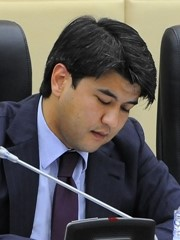
- Bishimbayev in 2016

Minister of National Economy
- In office 6 May 2016 – 28 December 2016
- President: Nursultan Nazarbayev
- Prime Minister: Karim Massimov; Bakhytzhan Sagintayev
- Preceded by: Erbolat Dosaev
- Succeeded by: Timur Suleimenov

Personal details
- Born: 11 April 1980 (age 46) Kyzyl-Orda, Kazakh SSR, Soviet Union
- Party: Nur Otan
- Spouses: Nazym Qaharman (div. 2020) Saltanat Nukenova (m. 2022; died 2023)
- Children: 4
- Education: Narxoz University; Dulaty University; George Washington University

Kuandyk Bishimbayev (be-SHIM-ba-yev; Kazakh: Қуандық Уәлиханұлы Бишімбаев, romanized: Quandyq Uälihanūly Bişımbaev, [qo̙wɑnˈdɯq bɘjˈʂɘmbɑjɯf]; born 11 April 1980) is a former Kazakh politician who served as Minister of National Economy of Kazakhstan from 6 May 2016 to 28 December 2016. In November 2023, he was charged with the murder of his wife Saltanat Nukenova and a widely publicized televised trial started in March 2024. He was convicted in May 2024 and sentenced to prison for 24 years.

== Early life and education ==
Bishimbayev was born in the city of Kyzyl-Orda (now Kyzylorda) in 1980. In 1999 he graduated from the Narxoz University in Almaty; then in 2001, from the Dulaty University. In 2003, he earned a master's degree in business administration from the George Washington University in Washington, D.C., as part of the Bolashak scholarship.

== Career ==
From 2003, Bishimbayev worked as manager of the Borrowing and Structured Finance Department, general manager of the Treasury Department of the Development Bank of Kazakhstan JSC. From 2004 to 2005, he was the head of the Functional Analysis Division of the Budget Policy and Planning Department, deputy head of the Investment Planning and Analysis Directorate of the Ministry of Economy and Budget Planning until becoming the managing director and a member of the board of the National Innovation Fund JSC. In 2005, Bishimbayev became the deputy chairman of the management board, member of the management board of JSC Center for Marketing and Analytical Research. From December 2005, he served as vice president of JSC Ordabasy Corporation and the chairman of the Board of Directors of JSC Interkomshina.

In 2006, Bishimbayev was appointed as the advisor to the Minister of Economy and Budget Planning, where he worked until he was appointed as advisor to the Deputy Prime Minister of Kazakhstan in December 2006. The next year, he was the president of the Center for the Development of Trade Policy JSC under the Ministry of Industry and Trade. From January 2007 to February 2008, Bishimbayev served as Vice Minister of Industry and Trade until becoming the head of the Department of Socio-Economic Monitoring of the Administration of the President of Kazakhstan in February 2008.

On 22 May 2009, Bishimbayev was appointed as the assistant to the President of Kazakhstan, where he served the post until becoming the Vice Minister of Trade and Economic Development on 16 March 2010. From May 2011 to May 2013, he worked as deputy chairman of the Board of the Samruk-Kazyna Fund. From 2013 to 2016, Bishimbayev was appointed as chairman of the board of the Baiterek National Managing Holding.

On 6 May 2016, he was appointed as Minister of National Economy after waves of unrest during the protests against land reforms to replace Erbolat Dosaev, however he was eventually dismissed from his post on 28 December 2016.

== Corruption charges and imprisonment ==
On 10 January 2017, by the National Bureau for Combating Corruption, Bishimbayev was convicted of allegedly receiving bribes on an especially large scale, in a group of persons by prior conspiracy where he was placed under arrest on 12 January.

On 14 March 2018, the Interdistrict Specialized Court for Criminal Cases of Astana found Bishimbayev guilty under the Criminal Code of the Republic of Kazakhstan. As a result, he was sentenced to 10 years of imprisonment in an institution of the maximum security penal system and was barred from holding leading positions in the civil service for life in any state organization, authorized capital of which the state share is more than 50%. Bishimbayev's property that was acquired with funds obtained by criminal means was confiscated.

Bishimbayev appealed to President Nursultan Nazarbayev for pardon which was granted in February 2019, and his prison term was reduced from 10 to 4 years. Bishimbayev was eventually released from prison early, on 11 December 2020.

== Murder charge ==
On 9 November 2023, Bishimbayev was detained on suspicion of murdering his wife, Saltanat Nukenova, in an Astana restaurant. Bakytzhan Bayzhanov, Bishimbayev's brother and the director of the "Gastro-Center" restaurant complex, in which the murder occurred, was also arrested on suspicion of failure to report a crime and leaving of a person in danger.

According to Deutsche Welle, restaurant staff were forbidden to call emergency services, and an instruction was given to erase CCTV footage under the pretext of technical failure. On 22 April 2024 Bishimbayev's phone inspection revealed 12 videos worth of footage of him beating, torturing, and berating Nukenova filmed on the day of her death.

A jury trial began 27 March 2024 in Astana. The court hearings were particularly notable for being completely televised live online on the Supreme Court's official YouTube page. On some days, the total number of views has varied from several hundred thousand to over a million.

On 13 May 2024, Bishimbayev was sentenced to 24 years in prison. His brother Bakytzhan Bayzhanov was sentenced to 4 years in prison.

== See also ==
- Trial of Kuandyk Bishimbayev
