= KIMEP University =

Private university in Almaty, Kazakhstan

- Kazakh: «КИМЭП Университеті» БАҚ; Russian: НАО «Университет КИМЭП»
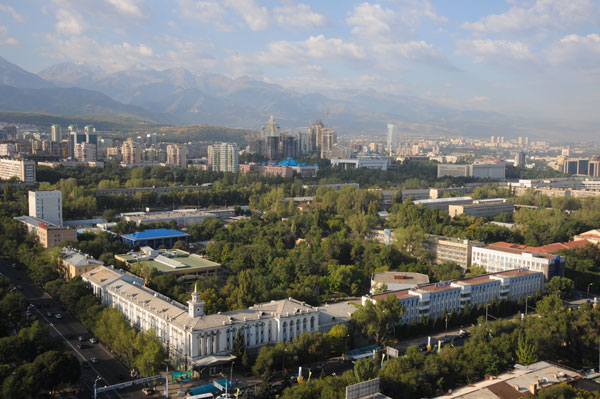
- An aerial view of KIMEP campus
- Type: Private
- Established: 1992
- President: Chan-Young Bang
- Faculty: 203
- Students: 2,737 (undergraduate); 584 (graduate); 108 (non-degree)
- Location: Almaty, Kazakhstan; 43.241944°N 76.955278°E
- Campus: Urban
- Colors: Blue, burgundy, gold
- Website: www.kimep.kz

KIMEP University, formerly Kazakhstan Institute of Management, Economics, and Forecasting, is a private university founded in 1992 in Almaty, Kazakhstan.

== History ==
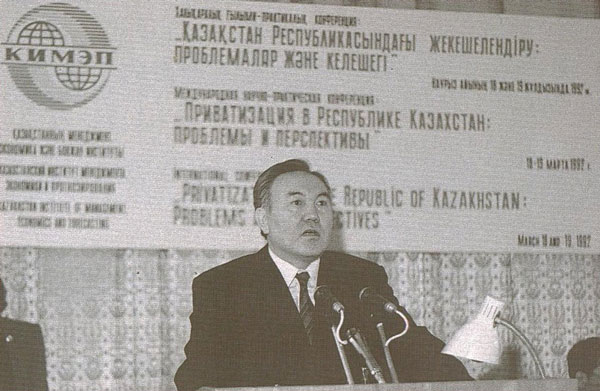
President Nazarbayev speaking at KIMEP during a conference on privatization in 1992

KIMEP was founded in 1992 under the instructions of then-President Nursultan Nazarbayev and major investor Madi Temirkhan. Its campus in south-central Almaty occupies the premises of the former Higher Party School of the Communist Party of Kazakhstan. It was among the first private institutions of higher education founded in the former Soviet Union. Nazarbayev appointed Chan-Young Bang, his former economic advisor, as the institute's first executive director.

The first MBA and MA in Economics programs were launched in 1992 and the MPA program began enrolling students in 1993. The first class, consisting of 81 MBA and MA students, graduated from KIMEP in 1994.

In 1998 the International Executive Center was created with the help of McGill University, Montreal, Quebec, Canada. In 1999 KIMEP introduced its first four-year bachelor programs in Business Administration and Social Sciences. 424 students enrolled in the undergraduate program.

In 2001 KIMEP became the first institution in Central Asia to implement an American-style course credit system for all academic programs.

Over the course of the decade, KIMEP launched new master's degrees, a Doctor of Business Administration program, a leadership certificate and many professional programs. Enrollment increased tenfold, thus the campus saw significant renovation, including the addition of a new library, an academic building and a gym.

In 2000, Chan-Young Bang became president of KIMEP, a position he still holds today. In 2004, KIMEP became a private, non-profit educational institution, with a 60% stake held by Dr. Bang and a 40% held by the Ministry of Education and Science of the Republic of Kazakhstan.

In 2008 the institute awarded nearly 600 bachelor's degrees and 152 master's degrees.

On January 26, 2012, the institution was renamed to KIMEP University.

== Colleges and programs ==
=== Divisions and programs ===
KIMEP has four academic colleges and two learning centers:

==== Colleges ====
The Bang College of Business (BCB) is the oldest (since 1992) and largest college within KIMEP University and offers Bachelor of Business Administration (BBA) degrees in management, Marketing, Finance, Accounting and Business Information Systems, Master of Business Administration (MBA) and PhD degrees in management, marketing, accounting and finance areas. In 2022, the Bachelor in Finance program received the European Foundation for Management Development Program (EFMD) accreditation, making BCB the first and only business school to have received the EFMD program accreditation in Kazakhstan and Central Asia.{https://www.efmdglobal.org/accreditations/business-schools/efmd-accredited/efmd-accredited-programmes/} Nejat Capar, PhD., currently serves as the Dean of the Bang College of Business.

The College of Social Sciences (CSS) consists of four departments:

- Department of Economics
- Department of International Relations and Regional Studies.
- Department of Media and Communication
- Department of Public Administration

It offers bachelor's and master's degrees in: economics, international relations, journalism, public and municipal administration, PhD programs in economics and in public administration and dual degree programs with Humboldt University Berlin (Master of Economics and Management Science) and with Yonsei University (Master of Global Affairs and Policy).

The Department of International Relations is member of an international consortium that offers a joint Erasmus Mundus international master's degree in Central & East European, Russian & Eurasian Studies.

Prominent faculty members at CSS are Francis Amagoh, PhD, Aigerim Kalybay, PhD, and Dr. Gulnara Dadabayeva. Dr. Gerald Pech serves as dean of the college.

The School of Law, established in 2010, is a member of the International Association of Law Schools. It offers two undergraduate Law degree programs: a Bachelor of Laws (LL.B.) and a Bachelor of International Law (B.I.L.). Each program has a minor in Public Law and in Private Law. Both may lead to eligibility to practice law in Kazakhstan. The programs also feature required Experiential Learning in the KIMEP Legal Clinic, Ask-A-Lawyer Project and/or international moot court and moot arbitration competitions. The Law School offers a Master of Laws (LL.M.) degree with tracks in either International Commercial Law or International Human Rights Law. The current dean is Richard Linstrom, J.D.

The College of Human Sciences and Education (CHSE) was established in 2019. The college offers four bachelor's degree programs: Two Foreign Languages (TESOL), Translation Studies, Cognitive Science, and Psychology; and four graduate programs: MSc in Psychology, MA in Foreign Languages (TESOL) and an MA in Education Policy and Management, PhD in Education Policy and Management. The CHE also offers the English Foundation, Academic English and General Education courses.

The founding and current dean of the college is Juldyz Smagulova, Ph.D.

==== Learning Centers ====
The Language Center offers the English language foundation course, which most students must take upon entry to KIMEP. The Language Center teaches courses in English, Russian, Kazakh, Chinese, Korean, German. It offers a master's degree in teaching English as a second language (MA in TESOL). First-year undergraduates at KIMEP take interdisciplinary courses from the Language Center as a part of the general education program.

In addition, KIMEP has an Executive Education Center (EEC), which offers certificate courses and professional development programs to adults and professionals in Almaty. It offers courses to high school students preparing them for the KIMEP entrance examination.

=== Rankings ===
In 2024, the Independent Quality Assurance Agency of Kazakhstan (IQAA) named KIMEP the best universities for humanities and economics in Kazakhstan.

=== License and attestation ===
KIMEP has a license to offer academic programs from the Ministry of Education and Science of the Republic of Kazakhstan.

KIMEP also has institutional accreditation from the European based Foundation for International Business Administration Accreditation (FIBAA) as well as FIBAA accreditation for programs such as the BSc and MSc in Psychology.

The Bang College of Business has received regional (level II) accreditation from the Asian Forum on Business Education, making KIMEP the first academic institution in Central Asia to receive this honor. The Department of Public Administration received accreditation from the European Association for Public Administration Accreditation.

In 2019 the university received an Institutional Accreditation from Foundation for International Business Administration accreditation (FIBAA) until 2025.

== Campus ==
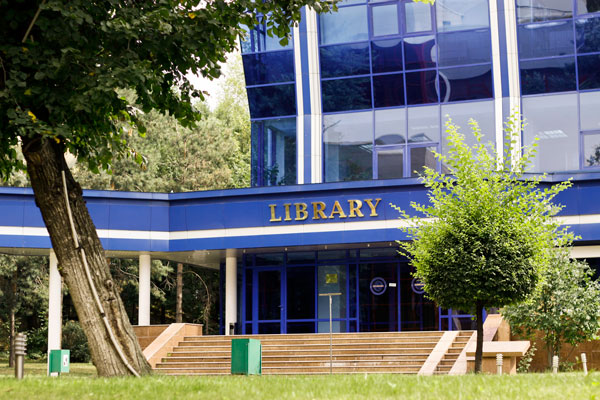
The Olivier Giscard d'Estaing Library at KIMEP

KIMEP's campus in south-central Almaty occupies the premises of the former Higher Party School of the Communist Party of Kazakhstan. It includes three main academic buildings, a library, sports center, dormitory, various fields and other facilities.

=== Library ===
The Olivier Giscard d'Estaing Library (OGEL), named after the founding dean of INSEAD, has the largest English-language collection in Central Asia (approximately 64,000) in addition to large Russian and Kazakh collections (approximately 36,000 total). The main collection specializes in publications on business, social sciences, law and languages. It offers KIMEP students access to several electronic libraries and resources. The library has space for studying, an electronic resources laboratory and a large computer room. OGEL librarians have created a major database of reference materials on Central Asia, which they continually update.

=== Sports Center ===
In November 2010, KIMEP opened a new Sports Center. The 325-square-meter facility includes a basketball court, two fitness rooms and a yoga studio. Beginning in 2011, the Sports Center offered a variety of curricular and extra-curricular courses to students. Students have free access to the facility, which is open six days a week.

== Student life ==
About 3,000 students are enrolled at KIMEP. Roughly 50% of KIMEP students come from outside Almaty. International and exchange students enrol from more than 25 countries, including China, India, Kyrgyzstan, Peru, South Korea, Spain, Tajikistan, United States, and Uzbekistan.

The KIMEP Students Association is a student-elected body to represent the interests of students to the administration. The KSA participates with full voting rights on all management committees. The KSA is also responsible for organizing and providing funding for all student clubs at KIMEP.

There are more than 30 student clubs at KIMEP, including the Kimep Fashion Industry, KIMEP Times, KIMEP Voice, KIMEP Film Society, Intellectual Debate Club, Math Club, Luca Accounting Club. In addition, there is a weekly English Club.

The Leadership Development Program invites guest lecturers from business, politics, and academia in Kazakhstan and around the world to speak to students about personal development and leadership.

== Alumni ==
So far^{when?} KIMEP has graduated more than 15,000 alumni. The KIMEP Alumni Association organizes events and networking for alumni of all programs. KIMEP alumni tend to work in the private and public sectors. According to a 2022 study, 93% of KIMEP graduates had full-time employment within six months of graduation.

Notable alumni include:

- Alikhan Smailov, 11th prime minister of Kazakhstan (2022-2024)
- Asset Irgaliyev (BAE 2008), The chairman of Agency for strategic planning and reforms
- Asel Karaulova (MBA 1994), president of Press Club of Kazakhstan
- Rinad Temirbekov (MBA 1999), director of Eurasia Foundation, Kazakhstan
- Galina Umarova (MPA 2000), vice president of Air Astana
- Gani Uzbekov (MA 1997), founder and CEO, S1LK
- Dana Inkarbekova (MBA 1995), country managing partner, PricewaterhouseCoopers
- Aigerim Khafizova (BSSPS 2010), founder and CEO, Edgravity
- Saken Zhumashev (MBA 2007), country managing partner, KPMG
- Aizhan Suleimenova (BAIJ 2014), chief editor, Forbes Women Kazakhstan
- Aisha Shaya (BSS 2008), co-founder, The Neue

== Faculty ==
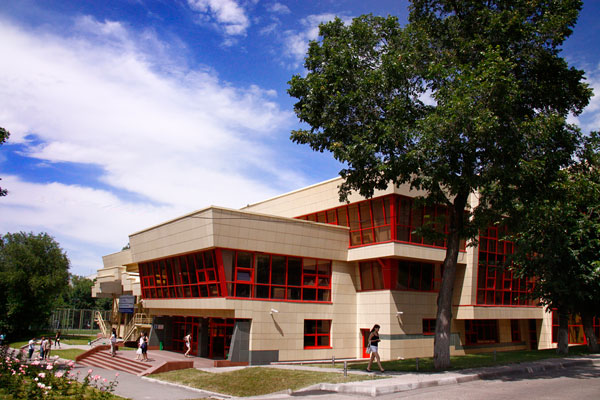
The New Academic Building at KIMEP

KIMEP has 111 faculty members coming from approximately 18 countries.

== Partner universities ==
KIMEP has active partnerships with more than 95 universities globally. Last academic year^{when?}, 175 KIMEP students enrolled in study abroad programs, while KIMEP hosted more than 300 international students. Some of KIMEP's partner universities are:

Country/Region	College or University
Canada	Laval University
Denmark	University of Copenhagen
Germany	University of Applied Sciences in Schmalkalden
Germany	Humboldt University
Poland	Collegium Civitas
Spain	Universitat Internacional de Catalunya
Sweden	Uppsala University
United States	Dickinson State University
United States	George Mason University
United States	Southeast Missouri State University
United States	Texas State University
United States	University of Northern Colorado
United States	University of San Francisco
United States	University of Wyoming
United States	Keuka College

Country/Region	College or University
Hong Kong	Hong Kong Baptist University
South Korea	Ewha Womans University
South Korea	Hankuk University of Foreign Studies
South Korea	Korea Cyber University
South Korea	Korea University
South Korea	UNIST (Ulsan National Institute of Science and technology)
South Korea	Kyung Hee University
South Korea	Pai Chai University
South Korea	Busan University of Foreign Studies
South Korea	Sookmyung Women's University
South Korea	Sungkyunkwan University
South Korea	Hallym University
Taiwan	Ching Yun University
Singapore	Singapore Management University
Tajikistan	Tajik State University of Commerce

KIMEP has established several dual-degree programs with universities outside of Kazakhstan. These include:

- Humboldt University Berlin, Germany (MA Economics/MSc in Economics and Management Science)
- University of Glasgow, UK (MIR/Master in Russian, Central and Eastern European Studies)
- IESEG School of Management/Catholic University of Lille, France (MBA/MIB)
- EM Strasbourg Business School/University of Strasbourg, France (BSc Business & Accounting/Bachelor in European Management)
- Yonsei University, South Korea (MA Economics/Master in Global Economy & Strategy, MIR/Master is Global Affairs & Policy, MIR/MA Korean Studies, MIR/Master in Global Economy & Strategy)

== Controversies ==
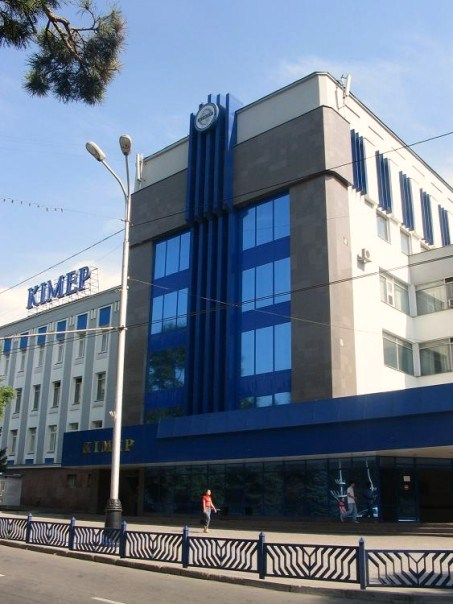
Academic building of KIMEP

In 2006 certain former faculty members published letters accusing the university of corruption and cronyism. In a letter to the Chronicle of Higher Education, the former faculty members claimed contracts and salaries were "compromised" at the institution. Former faculty published another letter in the opposition newspaper Respublika which accused several administrators of professional misconduct and lack of qualifications. The letter addressed the awarding of KIMEP tenders to USKO, a company chaired by Dr. Bang.

Responding in the same newspaper, Bang claimed that the accusations by the former faculty were not true. He noted that in 2006, 95% of KIMEP employees said they would recommend the school as a good place to work. He said four faculty members were regrettably fired because "their actions did not correspond to the mission and goals of the institute". He noted that those faculty members who left KIMEP voluntarily usually did so for personal reasons or because their time in Kazakhstan had come to a scheduled end. The letter also pointed out that out of eleven on-going or recently completed construction projects at KIMEP, only two were done by USKO, and that all such projects at KIMEP are examined by an independent committee.

In September 2010, the Ministry of Education and Science issued a decree showing an intention to suspend KIMEP's license for six months. The Ministry cited technical issues such as student-teacher ratio, classroom sizes and the templates of diplomas for the suspension. KIMEP filed an appeal against the suspension in Astana and continued to operate. Observers pointed out that the university had been operating for almost two decades and suggested that the sudden emergence of this problem after such a long period was politically motivated. Two weeks later, the Ministry fully reinstated KIMEP's license, stating that all violations had been resolved. Zhansit Tuimebayev, the minister of education and science who had issued the suspension of KIMEP's license, was moved to a different government position and replaced by Bakhytzhan Zhumagulov.

== See also ==
- Education in Kazakhstan
