= National Bank of Kazakhstan =

Central bank of Kazakhstan

Coordinates: 43.2352°N 76.9179°E

National Bank of Kazakhstan Қазақстан Ұлттық Банкі

- New headquarter
- Central bank of: Kazakhstan
- Headquarters: Astana
- Established: 13 April 1993
- Ownership: 100% state ownership
- Governor: Timur Suleimenov
- Currency: Kazakhstan Tenge; KZT (ISO 4217)
- Reserves: 19,790 million USD
- Website: www.nationalbank.kz

The National Bank of Kazakhstan (Note: Kazakh: Қазақстан Ұлттық Банкі, romanized: Qazaqstan Ūlttyq Bankı; Russian: Национальный Банк Казахстана, romanized: Nacionaljnyj Bank Kazahstana) is the central bank of Kazakhstan.

== History ==
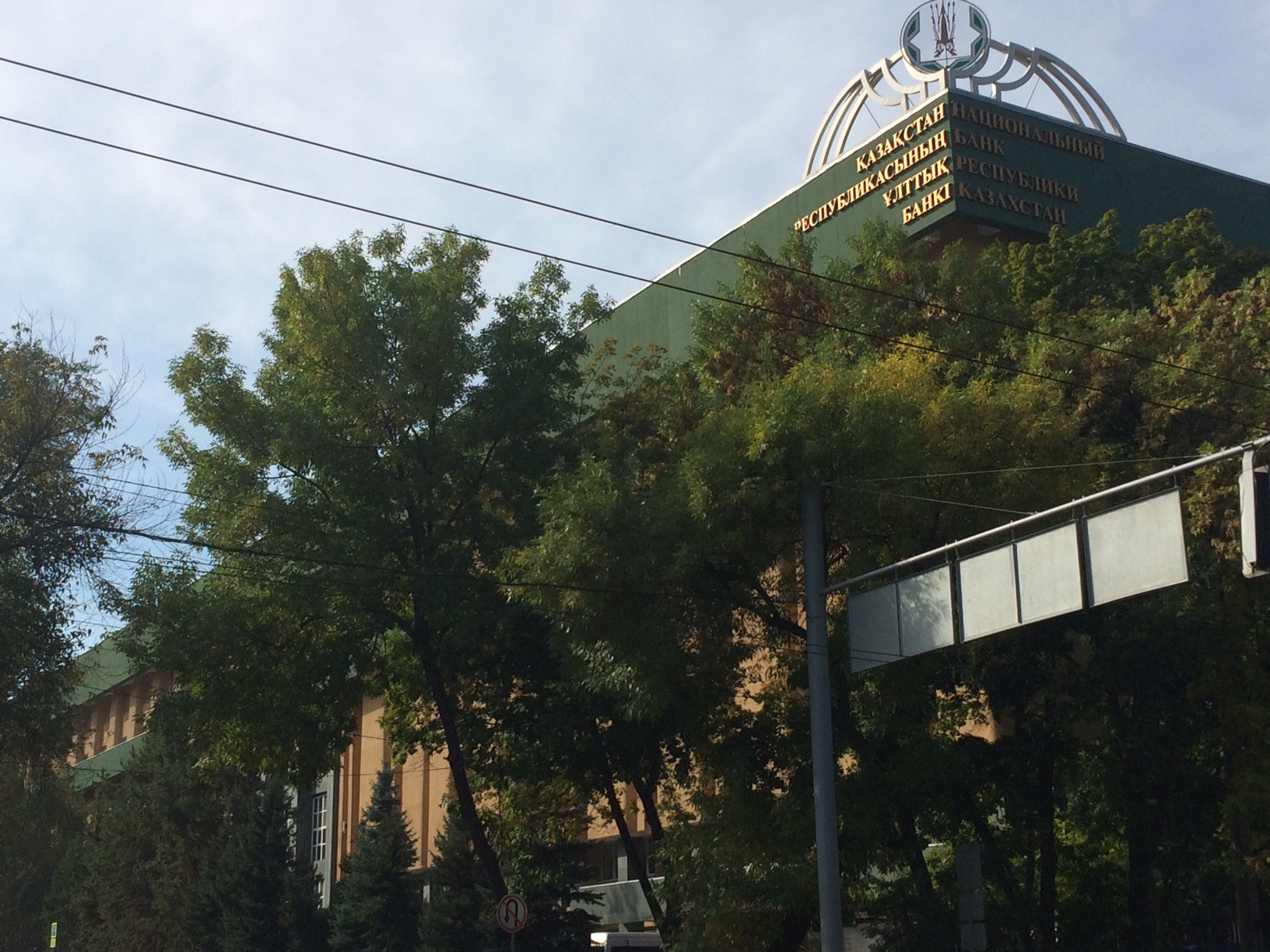
The former headquarters of the National Bank of the Republic of Kazakhstan in Almaty

The National Bank of Kazakhstan was established on the basis of the Kazakh Republican Bank of the State Bank of the USSR (since 1990, the State Bank of the Kazakh SSR; since 1991, the National State Bank of the Kazakh SSR).

On 13 April 1993, in accordance with the Law "On the National Bank of the Republic of Kazakhstan", the National Bank of the Kazakh SSR was renamed the National Bank of the Republic of Kazakhstan.

On 30 March 1995, a new Law of the Republic of Kazakhstan dated March 30, 1995 No. 2155 "On the National Bank of the Republic of Kazakhstan" was issued.

On 15 November 1999, the National Bank of Kazakhstan became the founder and the sole shareholder of the Kazakhstan Deposit Insurance Fund ("KDIF").

== Management Structure ==
The National Bank is accountable to the President of the Republic of Kazakhstan, but acting independently to the extent scope of authority granted under the legislation thereto.

The National Bank coordinates its activities with the Government of the Republic of Kazakhstan, taking into account and facilitating the economic policy of the government, unless it contradicts the implementation of its own basic functions and monetary policy.

The supreme governing body of the National Bank is the Management Board, and the operational control authority is the Board of Directors. The Management Board consists of nine people. The Management Board includes the Chairman of the National Bank and four officials (Vice-Chairmen) of the National Bank, one representative of the President of the Republic of Kazakhstan, two government representatives of the Republic of Kazakhstan and the Chairman of the Committee for Control and Supervision of the Financial Market and Financial Institutions of the National Bank.

The organisational structure of the National Bank of Kazakhstan comprises the followingCentral headquarters:

- the Central Office consisting of 11 departments (with one department in Nur-Sultan), 10 independent offices and 1 independent department
- 16 regional branches and one branch in the City of Almaty: Cash and Custody Services Centre
- Five reporting entities:
  - Centre for Operational Support of the National Bank of the Republic of Kazakhstan, Joint Stock Company
  - Kazakhstan Interbank Settlement Centre, the Republican State Enterprise on the Right of Economic Use
  - Banking Service Office of the National Bank of Kazakhstan, Joint Stock Company
  - Kazakhstan Mint of the National Bank of the Republic of Kazakhstan, the Republican State Enterprise on the Right of Economic Use
  - The Banknote Factory of the National Bank of the Republic of Kazakhstan, the Republican State Enterprise on the Right of Economic Use

== Governors ==
Governor	Took office	Left office	Notes
Ghalym Bainasarov	1992	1993	
Daulet Sembaev	1993	1996	
Oraz Jandosov	1996	1998	
Kadyrzhan Damitov	1998	1999	
Grigori Marchenko	1999	2004	
Anvar Saidenov	2004	2009	
Grigori Marchenko	2009	2013	
Kairat Kelimbetov	2013	2015	
Daniyar Akishev	2015	2019	
Erbolat Dossaev	2019	2022	
Galymzhan Pirmatov	2022	2023	
Timur Suleimenov	2023	Incumbent	

=== Current Deputy Governors ===
- Yerulan Zhamaubayev (since 2025)
- Akylzhan Baimagambetov (since 2019)
- Aliya Moldabekova (since 2019)
- Binur Zhalenov (since 2026)
- Daniyar Vagapov (since 2020)
- Vitaliy Tutushkin (since 2022)

== Shares ==
The National Bank of the Republic of Kazakhstan is the stockholder of the following corporations:

- Kazakhstan Deposit Insurance Fund;
- Unified Accumulative Pension Fund, Joint Stock Company

== Location ==
It is headquartered in Astana, located on Mäñgılık El street, 57A.

== See also ==
- Economy of Kazakhstan
- Kazakhstani tenge
- List of central banks
- List of financial supervisory authorities by country
