= Kairat Kelimbetov =

Kazakh politician (born 1969)

- Қайрат Келімбетов
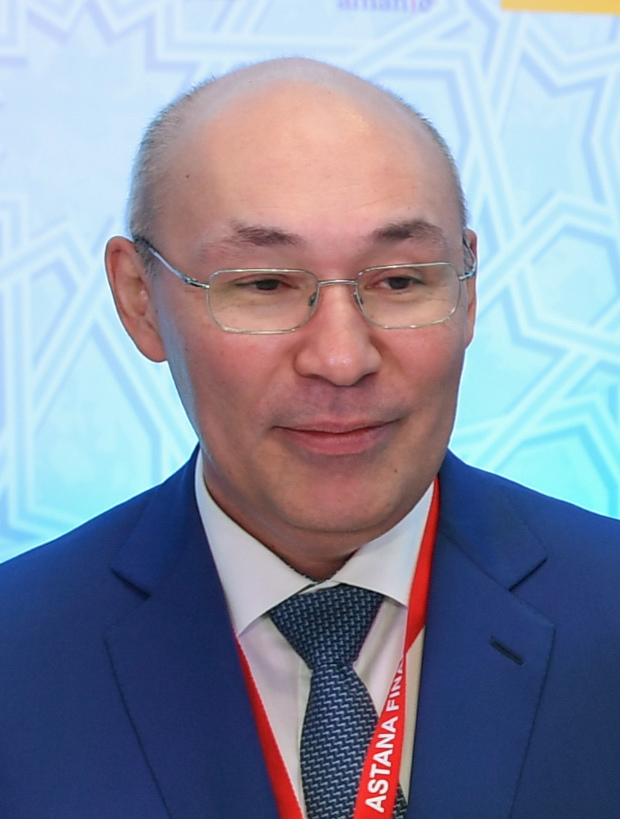
- Kelimbetov in 2018

Head of the Presidential Administration of Kazakhstan
- In office 23 January 2008 – 13 October 2008
- President: Nursultan Nazarbayev
- Preceded by: Adilbek Dzhaksybekov
- Succeeded by: Aslan Musin

Deputy Prime Minister of Kazakhstan
- In office 20 January 2012 – 1 October 2013
- President: Nursultan Nazarbayev
- Prime Minister: Serik Akhmetov

Minister of Economic Development and Trade
- In office 11 April 2011 – 20 January 2012
- President: Nursultan Nazarbayev
- Prime Minister: Karim Massimov
- Preceded by: Zhanar Aitzhanova
- Succeeded by: Bakhytzhan Sagintayev

Minister of Economy and Budget Planning
- In office 28 August 2002 – 18 April 2006
- President: Nursultan Nazarbayev
- Prime Minister: Imangali Tasmagambetov (2002–2003); Daniyal Akhmetov (2003–2006)
- Preceded by: Majit Esenbaev (Economy and Trade)
- Succeeded by: Karim Massimov

Chairman of the National Bank of Kazakhstan
- In office 1 October 2013 – 2 November 2015
- President: Nursultan Nazarbayev
- Preceded by: Grigory Marchenko
- Succeeded by: Daniyar Akishev

Personal details
- Born: 28 January 1969 (age 57) Alma-Ata, Kazakh SSR, Soviet Union
- Party: Nur Otan
- Spouse: Fatima Kelimbetova
- Children: 3
- Education: Moscow State University

Kairat Kelimbetov (Kazakh: Qairat Nematūly Kelımbetov, Қайрат Нематұлы Келімбетов; born 28 January 1969) is a Kazakh politician, from 2015 to 2022, he held the position of the Governor of the Astana International Financial Centre. He served as a Governor of the National Bank of Kazakhstan from October 1 of 2013 until November 2 of 2015. He served as a Vice-Prime Minister of Kazakhstan from January 20 of 2012 till October 1 of 2013. He also was the CEO of Samruk-Kazyna Sovereign Wealth Fund and as the Minister of Economy and Budget Planning in the Government of Kazakhstan. In late July 2005, Minister Kelimbetov announced that Kazakhstan's GDP grew by 9.1% in the previous year.

Mr. Kelimbetov was instrumental in developing numerous reforms and economic policies. As the Chief Executive of Samruk-Kazyna SWF he was responsible for the anti-crisis program launched in 2008, as well as the development programs of major state owned enterprises. As a deputy Prime Minister of Kazakhstan, he represented the country during the creation of Eurasian Economic Union and oversaw macroeconomic policy of the government. Under his management, the National Bank of Kazakhstan adopted a new monetary policy regime.

He is a graduate of Georgetown University's Edmund A. Walsh School of Foreign Service (Pew Economic Freedom Fellows Program, 1999), the Kazakh State Academy of Economics (management, 1996), and Lomonosov Moscow State University (Mathematics, 1993).
