= Shipton Kaserne =

U.S. army base in Germany

- Part of USAG Ansbach

Site information
- Type: US Army Post
- Open to the public: No

Location
- Location in Germany
- Location within Germany
- Coordinates: 49.317798°N 10.615594°E

Site history
- Built: 1980s
- In use: 1988-Present

Garrison information
- Garrison: 5th Battalion 4th Air Defense Artillery Regiment

Shipton Kaserne is a small United States Army post outside of Ansbach, Germany. Named after Brigadier General James Ancil Shipton, the post was built in the late 1980s and was officially opened January 8, 1988. Shipton is located in-between Katterbach and Ansbach, adjacent to Soldier's Lake and Urlas Housing and Shopping Complex. It was the home of the 412th Aviation Support Battalion from 2006 and is still used by the United States Army today. Since its creation, Shipton Kaserne has been home to several units, including the 6th Battalion, 43rd Air Defence Artillery Regiment (6/43 Air Defense Artillery), 6/52 Air Defense Artillery, and the 601st Aviation Support Battalion.

== Controversy ==
In 2017, the city of Ansbach alongside the Ansbach University of Applied Sciences had plans on turning the base to a living space and a campus for the Hochschule Ansbach after an announcement made by the US Army about the inactivation of the base. These plans were however canceled after the US Army decided to keep using the base. This caused somewhat of an outrage amongst citizens in Ansbach.
