= Order of the Swan =

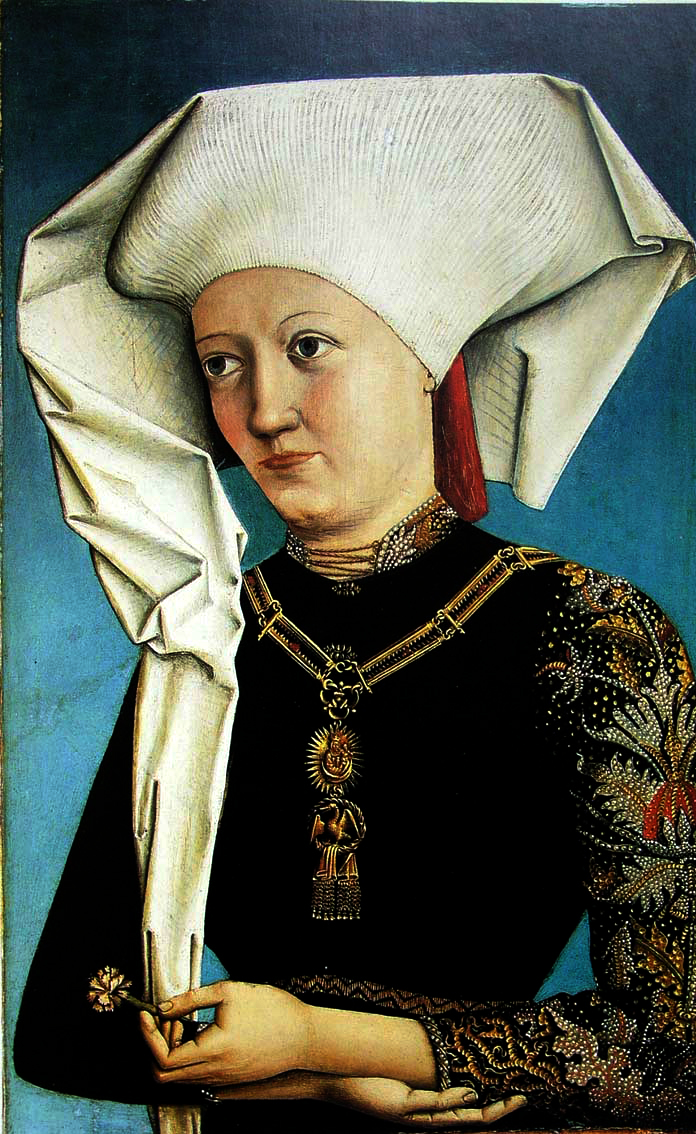
Hemma von Gurk wearing the Order of the Swan, c.1490

The Order of the Swan (German: Schwanenorden) was a spiritual chivalric order of princes and nobles ruled by the House of Hohenzollern. It was founded on 29 September 1440 by Elector Frederick II of Brandenburg with reference to the medieval tale of the Swan Knight.

The association originally comprised, with Elector Frederick at their head, thirty men and seven women united to honor Virgin Mary. Its headquarters was the Romanesque St. Mary's pilgrimage church, the centre of a Premonstratensian monastery located on a hill near Brandenburg an der Havel. In 1459, the Hohenzollern margrave Albert Achilles established a filial at the St. Gumbertus church near his Ansbach Residence.

The order spread rapidly, numbering in 1464 about 330 members, as well as further branches established in the Franconian Principality of Ansbach and in the possessions of the Teutonic Order in East Prussia. Along with encouraging more enthusiastic homage to Virgin Mary, the order sought to foster perseverance in works of mercy. It was extinguished during the Protestant Reformation, since that movement discouraged devotions to Mary.

In 1843 the order was revived, perhaps as no more than an idea by King Frederick William IV of Prussia he never realised. In this incarnation, it was an association, open to men and women of all creeds, for the amelioration of physical and moral ills. Currently, a Schwanenritterorden charitable association exists in Nuremberg, under the patronage of the Hohenzollern prince Philip Kirill of Prussia.

== Gallery ==
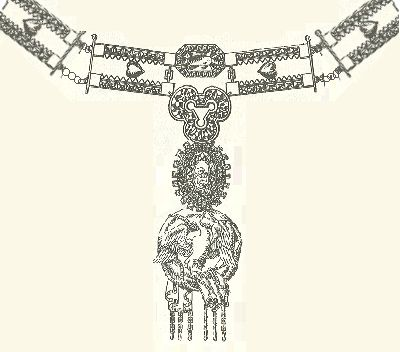
The chain of the Order

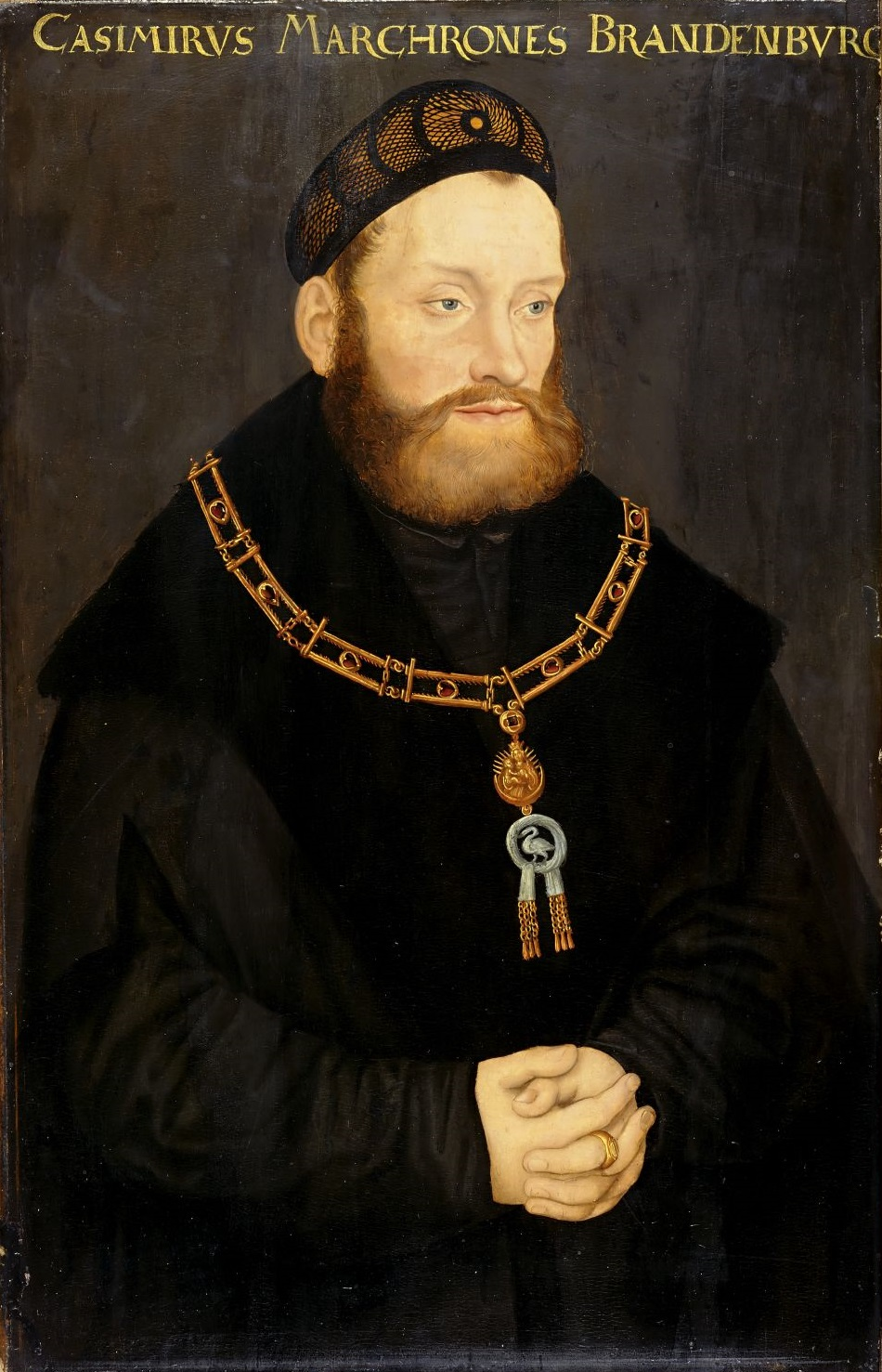
Portrait of Margrave Kasimir of Brandenburg-Kulmbach, workshop of Lucas Cranach the Elder

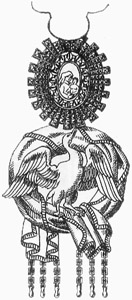
Jewel depicting the Virgin and Child with Swan

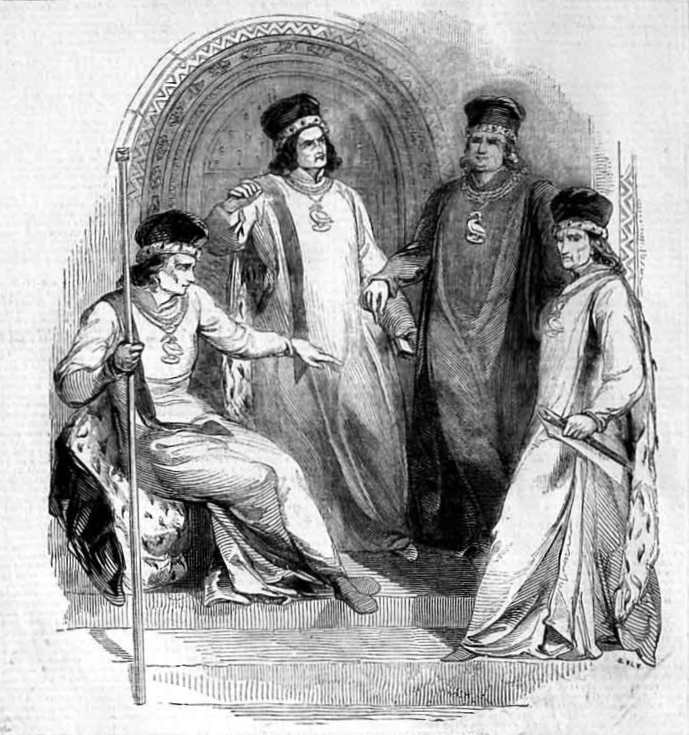
Knights of the Ancient Order of the Swan (1844)

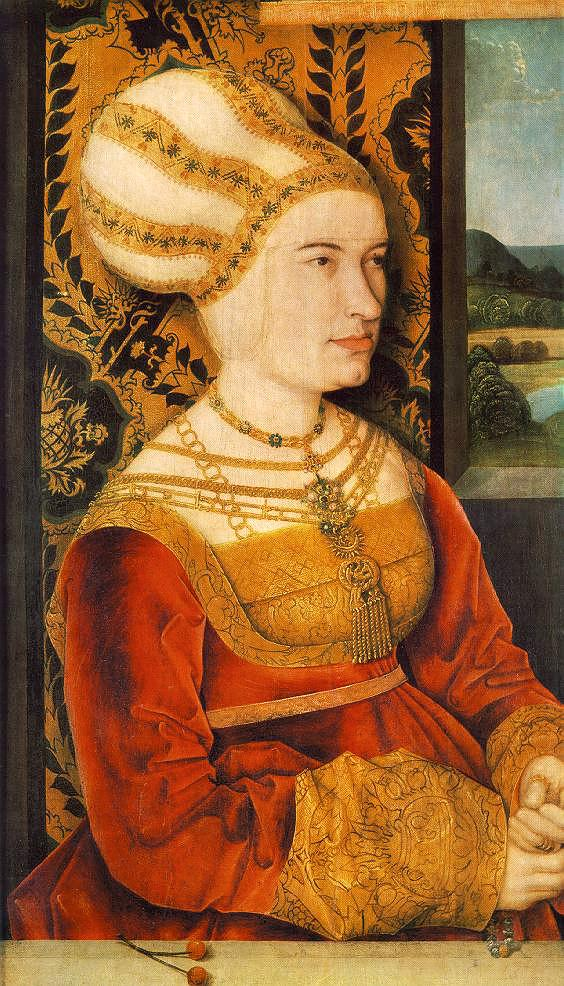
Portrait of Sybilla von Freyberg by Bernhard Strigel
