= Bachwoche Ansbach =

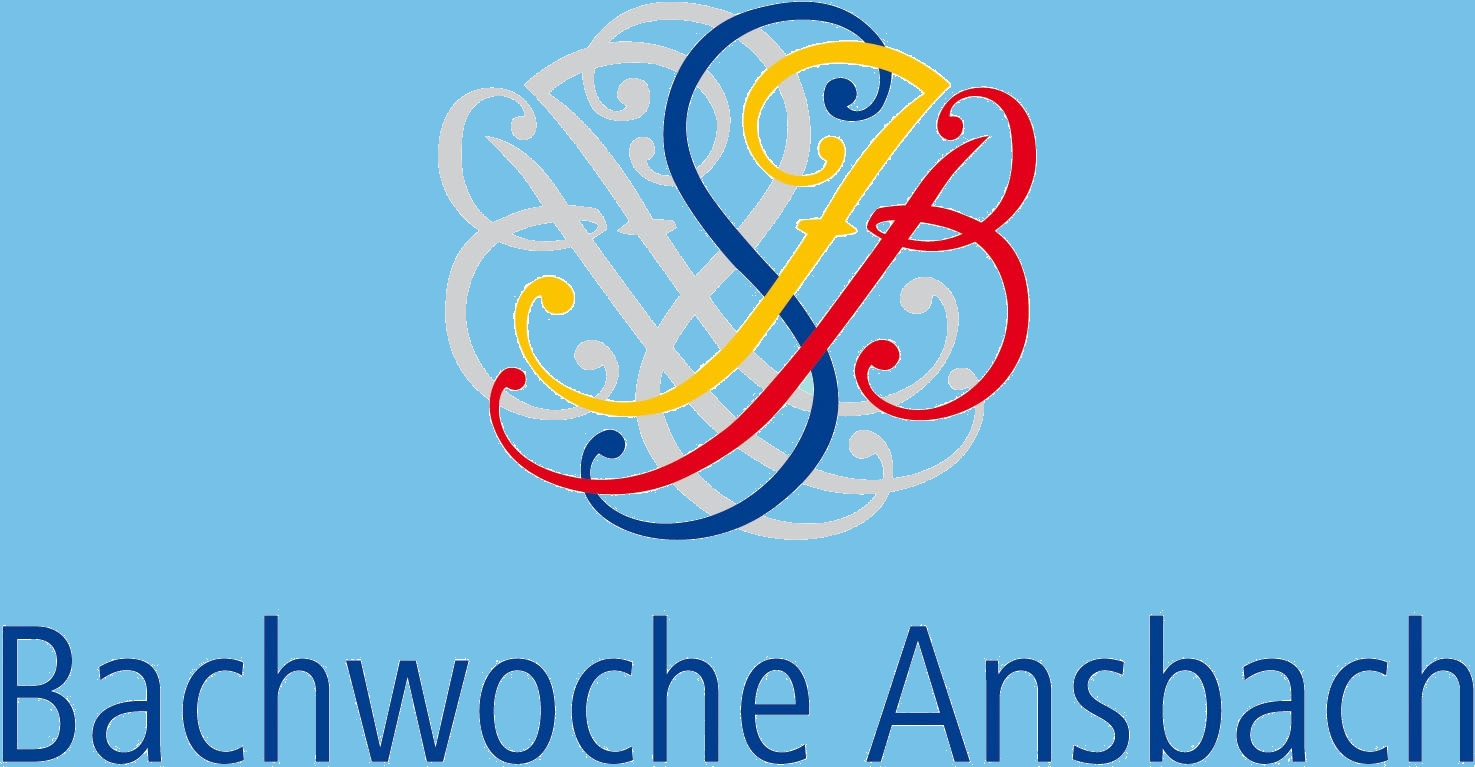

The Bachwoche Ansbach (Ansbach Bach Week) is a biennial music festival in Ansbach, Germany, dedicated to the life and works of Johann Sebastian Bach, held since 1947. The main venues are the Orangerie and the great hall of the palace Residenz Ansbach, and the churches St. Johannis and St. Gumbertus. Renowned international have performed in Ansbach, including Yehudi Menuhin, Gidon Kremer, Mstislav Rostropovich, Ludwig Hoelscher, Ferdinand Leitner and Karl Richter. In recent years, guests have included John Eliot Gardiner, Philippe Herreweghe, Ton Koopman, Andreas Staier, Martin Stadtfeld and Masaaki Suzuki.

== History ==
In the first year, in 1947, the festival was held at the palace Schloss Weißenstein in Pommersfelden. In 1948, it was moved to the Ansbach and its palace. the Residenz Ansbach (also called Markgrafenschloss), where concerts were held at the Orangerie in the garden Hofgarten and in the Festsaal (Great hall).

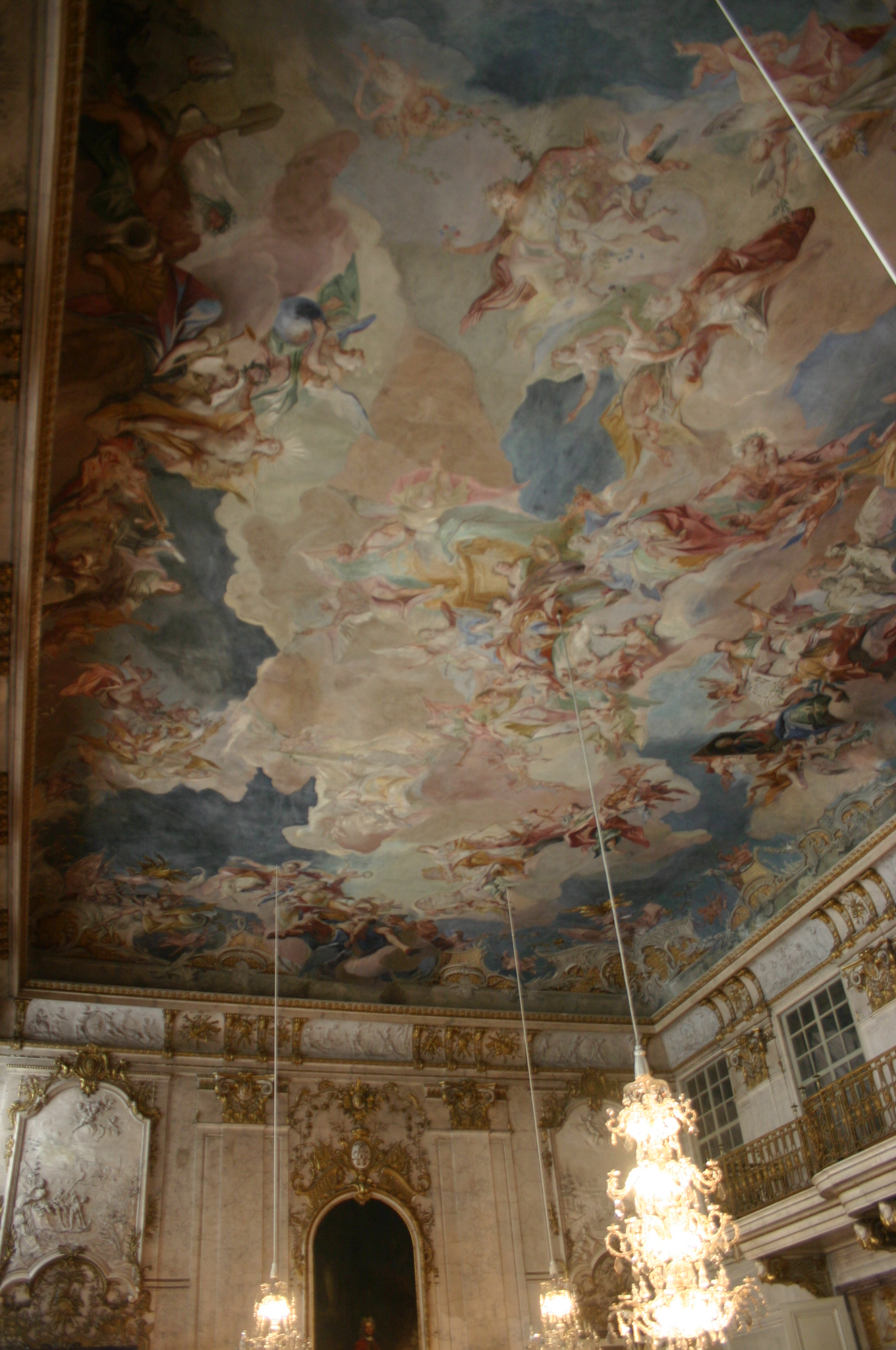
Festsaal of the Residenz, painting by Carlo Carlone

Other main venues are the churches St. Gumbertus and St. Johannis. A few concerts are offered in other halls. In the beginning the Munich art dealer Carl Weymar, the cellist Ludwig Hoelscher and the conductor Ferdinand Leitner invited friends to perform. They were able to attract guests such as violinists Wolfgang Schneiderhan and Yehudi Menuhin, pianist Wilhelm Kempff, flutist Aurèle Nicolet, singers Peter Pears and Dietrich Fischer-Dieskau. An orchestra of soloists formed the backbone of the festival week. In 1955, Peter Pears was one of the first non-Germans invited, he appeared again in 1959, 1963 and 1964.

From 1955 to 1964 the festival was directed by harpsichordist and conductor Karl Richter, originally an organist here. His successor Rudolf Hetzer was able to win the city as a sponsor of the festival and began a biennial cycle in 1967. Artist during this period included Nathan Milstein, Mstislav Rostropovich and Neville Marriner, orchestras The English Consort and the London Baroque Soloists, introducing historically informed performances. Saturday Review said in 1958, "The choir of the Bachwoche Ansbach is good, the recording excellent." Helmuth Rilling conducted Bach's Mass in B minor in 1969 and again 40 years later, both times with the Gächinger Kantorei and the Bach-Collegium Stuttgart at St. Gumbertus.

From 1979, Hans Georg Schäfer took over as director and led the festival for almost 20 years. He included music by Bach's sons, Claudio Monteverdi, Henry Purcell and Heinrich Schütz. He also showed contemporary composers in relation to Bach, such as Paul Hindemith, Witold Lutoslawski and Arvo Pärt. He established an extra festival in 2000, the 250th anniversary of Bach's death, solely dedicated to Bach's music. From 2001 Lotte Thaler was artistic director. She set new standards by set themes ("Bach und Stravinsky"), included more music of the 20th century and included talks, children's concert and jazz.

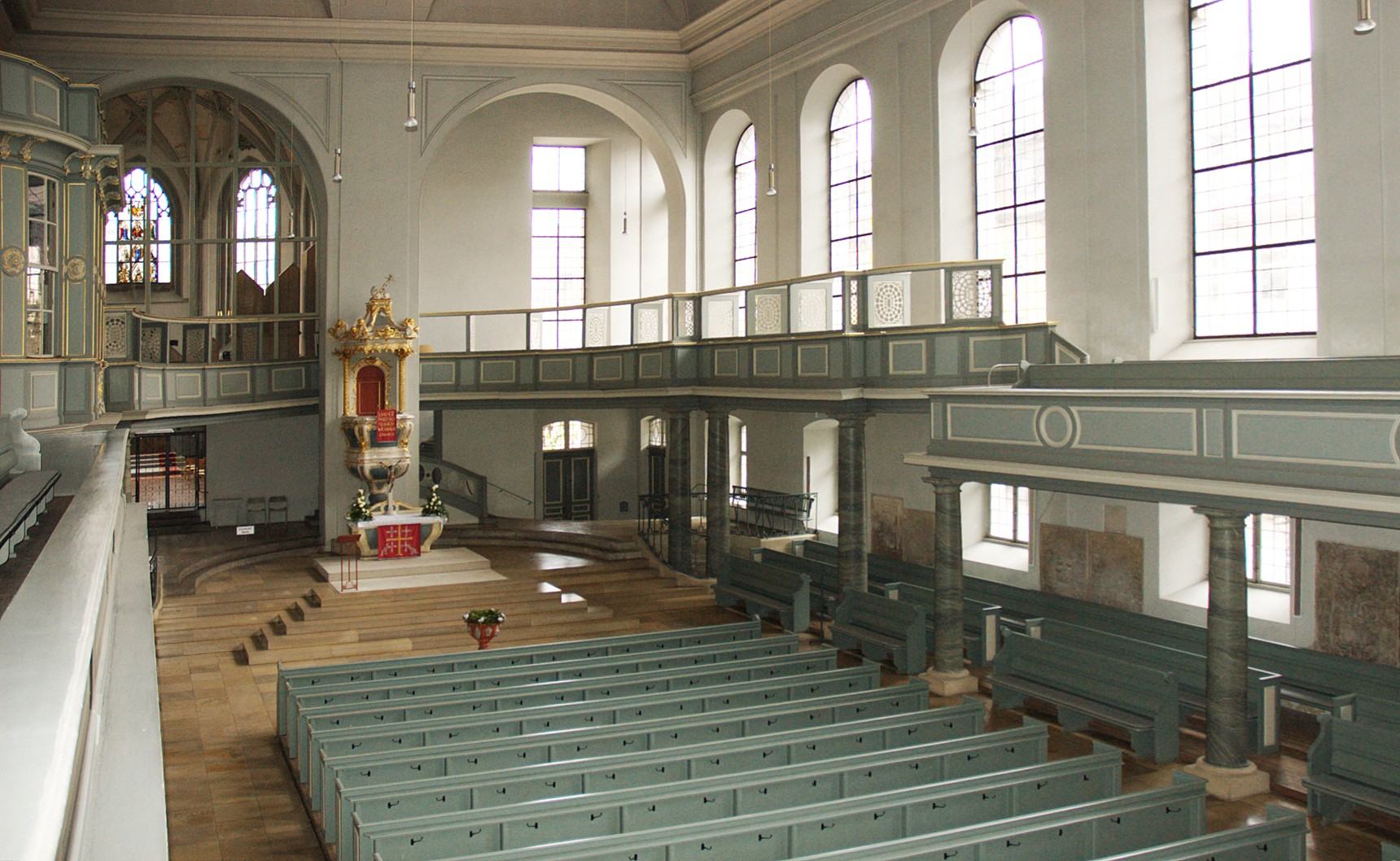
St. Gumbertus, interior

Since 2006, Andreas Bomba has been the director, leading the 60 anniversary season in 2007. The 2011 Bachwoche was opened with a Bach cantata service in St. Gumbertus, including a performance of Wer nur den lieben Gott läßt walten, BWV 93. Cantatas BWV 1, BWV 48, BWV 78, BWV 117, BWV 124, BWV 140 and BWV 147 were performed in concerts by the Windsbacher Knabenchor, conducted by Karl-Friedrich Beringer, with soloists Sibylla Rubens, Ingeborg Danz, Rebecca Martin, Markus Schäfer and Klaus Mertens. Artists have included Andreas Scholl, the Münchner Kammerorchester and the Ensemble Resonanz. The week was concluded with a performance of Bach's Mass in B minor by the Dresdner Kammerchor and the Dresdner Barockorchester, conducted by Hans-Christoph Rademann.
