= St. Gumbertus, Ansbach =

Coordinates: 49°18′10″N 10°34′24″E

St. Gumbertus
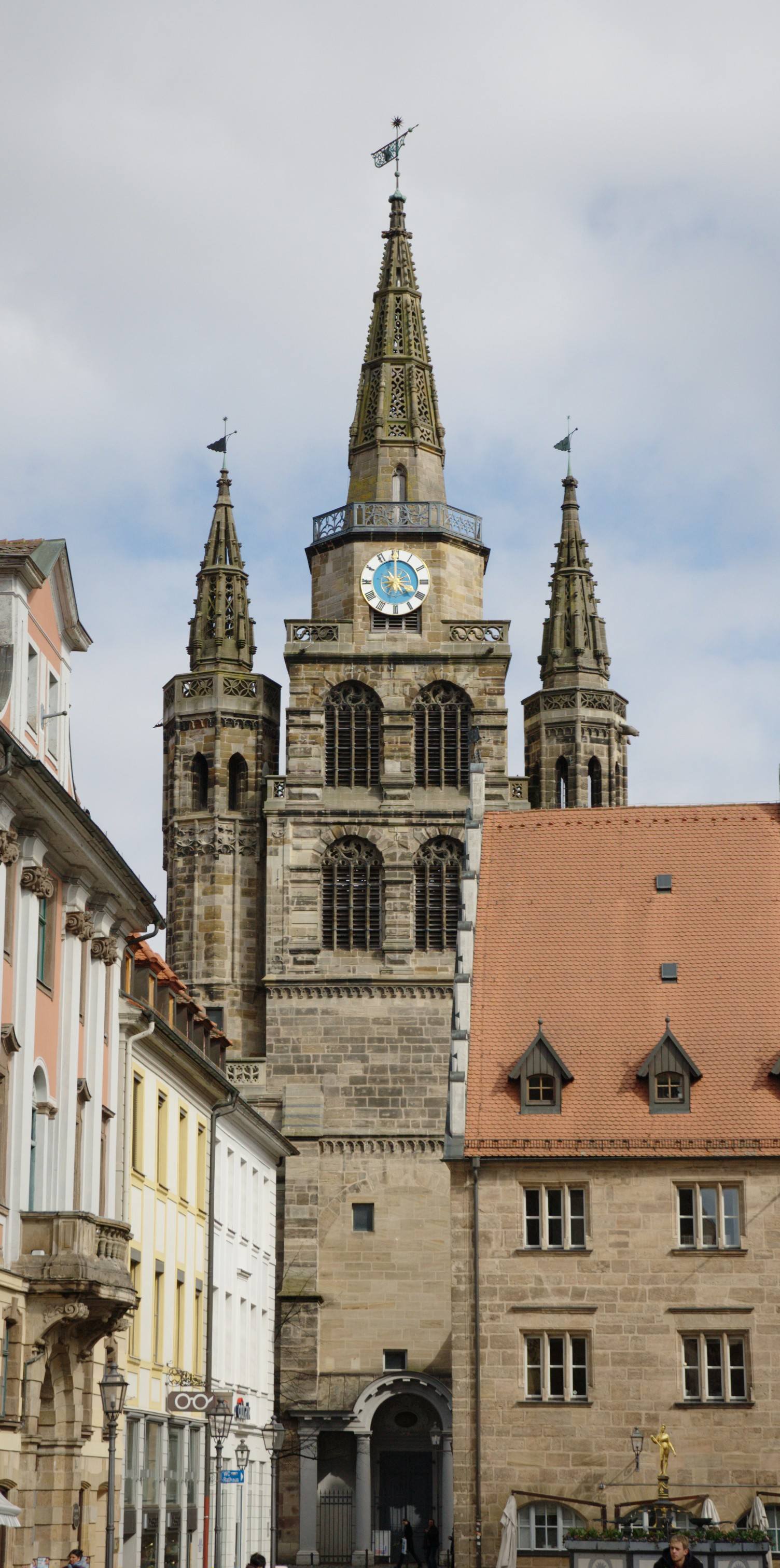
- St. Gumbertus
- Location: Ansbach
- Country: Germany
- Denomination: Lutheran
- Previous denomination: Catholic
- Website: innenstadtkirchen-ansbach.de/kirche-st-gumbertus

History
- Status: Parish church

Architecture
- Functional status: Active
- Style: Renaissance
- Years built: 14th century

Administration
- Division: Lutheran Church of Bavaria

The church of St. Gumbertus, named for Saint Gondelbert, is one of the central city churches of Ansbach, Bavaria, together with the neighboring St. Johannis. Located in the Altstadt (old town) of Ansbach, St. Gumbertus, now a Lutheran church, was originally the church of a monastery that was founded by St. Gumbert around 750. Today it serves as a venue for concerts of the music festival Bachwoche Ansbach. The church contains the oldest structures in Ansbach and is considered Ansbach's city symbol.

== History ==
Gumbert, who was later proclaimed a saint, around 750 founded a monastery dedicated to Mary, following the Benedictine Rule. In the 11th century it was converted to a Chorherrenstift or collegiate church. George, Margrave of Brandenburg-Ansbach, followed the Reformation in 1528; under the principle Cuius regio, eius religio the monastery was dissolved in 1563. One of the treasures of the monastery was the Gumbertus Bible, written in Regensburg or Salzburg in the late 12th century. In 1195 it was purchased by the monastery; it is now MS. 1 in Erlangen University Library.

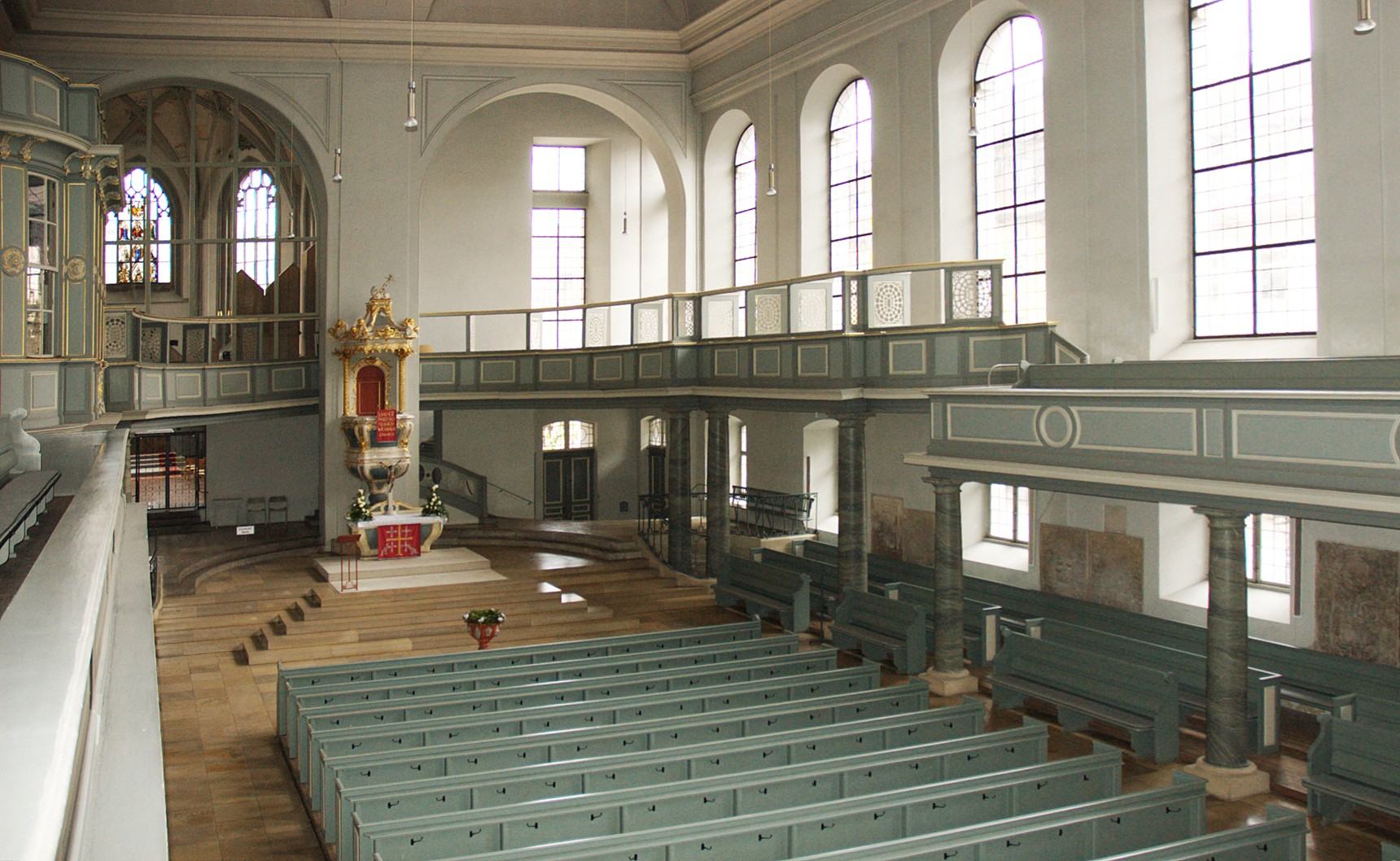
Interior

The St. Gumbertuskirche combines changing architectural styles. The oldest constructions in Ansbach are found in the crypt (around 1040), the pantheon of the Margraves of Ansbach and the only surviving parts of the original church. The Georgskapelle (St. George's Chapel) dates to the 14th century. The nave was originally Romanesque, the choir Gothic. The choir was transformed in the 16th century to a chapel Schwanenritterkapelle (Swan Knights Chapel), housing "elaborate epitaphs and death shields of members of the Order of the Swan, a lay foundation of Margrave Albrecht Achilles." The whole building was changed in 1738 to a Repräsentationskirchenbau (representative church) by Charles William Frederick, Margrave of Brandenburg-Ansbach, under architect Leopold Retty. The nave was remodelled into a preaching hall in a restrained palette of gray and cream, built to cater to the Lutheran concentration on preaching, without the embellishments of side altars. The marble altar and the pulpit are main attractions of the church.

After the dissolution of the Margraviate in 1791, the former court church became a Lutheran parish church, which now serves three districts in the eastern half of the city with about 6,000 church members. The church is a venue for church events and for concerts of the Bachwoche Ansbach, local groups and the Windsbacher Knabenchor.

== Organ ==
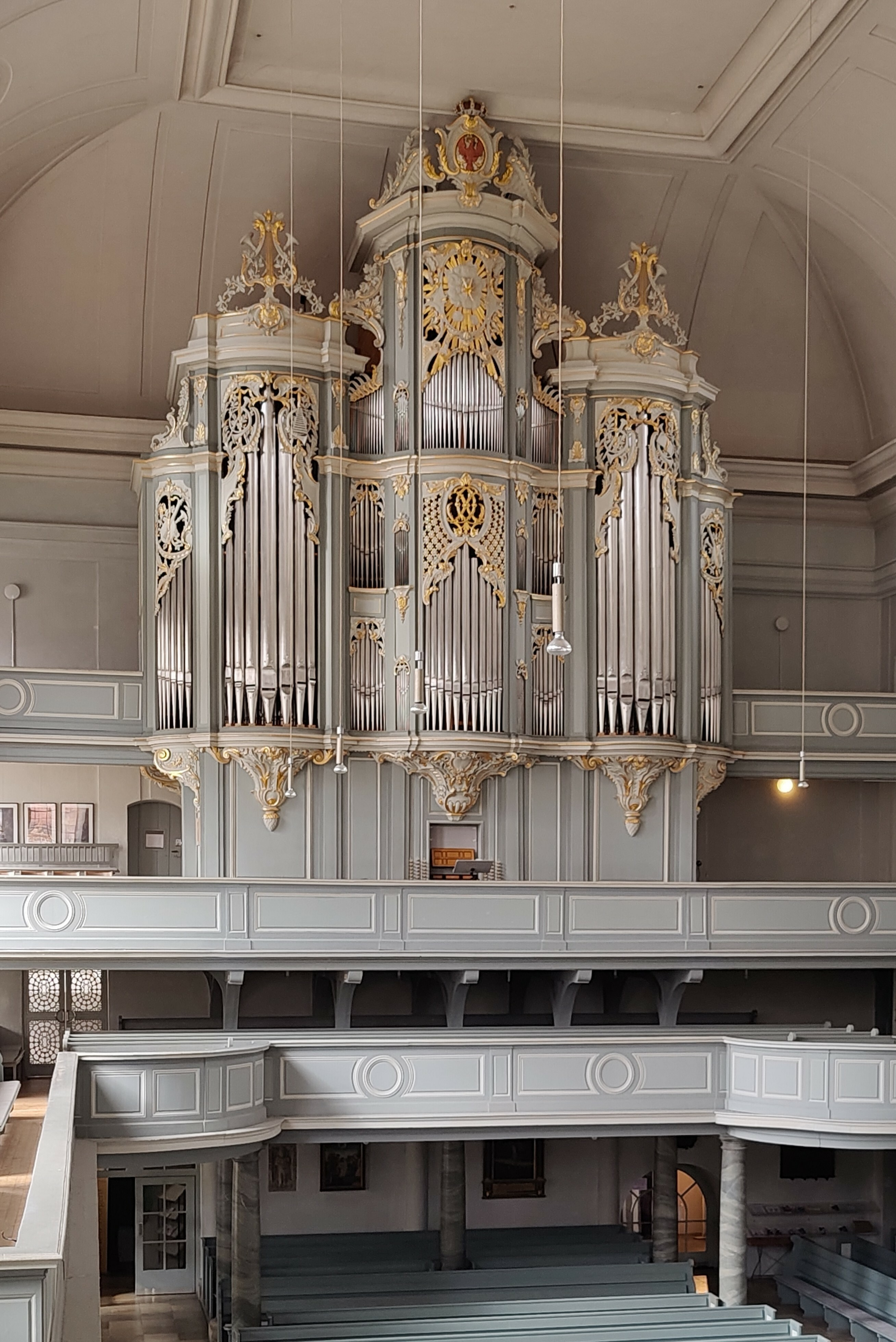
Wiegleb organ

The organ at St. Gumbertus was built from 1736 to 1739 by Johann Christoph Wiegleb; the original choir had 47 different stops on three manuals, and was the largest and most prestigious organ in the region of Franconia. It was rebuilt in 1884 by Georg Friedrich Steinmeyer of the firm Steinmeyer in romantic style, utilising materials of the older organ, praised by Albert Schweitzer, and again by the same firm in 1961 in neo-Baroque style. A controversy revolved around the issue as to whether the organ should be retained or restored to the original Wiegleb design.

In 2004, the church council resolved to get the historic organ restored. The restoration work was carried out by Orgelmakerij Reil (Heerde, Netherlands) at a cost of euro 1.5 million euro, with funds raised from private donations and the association "Friends of the Ansbach Bach Week"). It was recommissioned on 17 June 2007 during the Bach week.
