= Ansbach University of Applied Sciences =

University of applied sciences in the German state of Bavaria

Coordinates: 49°18′22″N 10°34′02″E

- Hochschule Ansbach
- Motto: Studying with Prospect
- Type: Public (Free State of Bavaria)
- Established: 1996
- President: Prof. Dr.-Ing. Sascha Müller-Feuerstein
- Students: 3,500 (2022)
- Location: Hochschule Ansbach; Residenzstraße 8; 91522 Ansbach, Ansbach, Bayern, Germany
- Colors: Blue and Green
- Website: www.hs-ansbach.de

Ansbach University (German: Hochschule Ansbach) is a university of applied sciences, involved in education and research. It is located in Ansbach in the southern German state of Bavaria. It is located 2km from the Ansbach Residence. Since 2008 it has been a partner university of elite sport (DOSB) and has many German national, Olympic, and world champions among its alumni. In September 2023 the state of Bavaria decided to confer the right to award doctorates to Ansbach University of Applied Sciences.

== Faculties ==
=== Faculty of Engineering Sciences ===
The following programs are available in this faculty:

- Industrial Engineering with Business Studies (since autumn 1997)
- Energy and Environmental Systems Engineering (since autumn 2001)
- Industrial Biotechnology (since autumn 2009)
- Biomedical Engineering (since autumn 2009)
- Biomedical Engineering (since autumn 2009)
- Smart Energy Systems (SES)
- Sustainable Building Systems (SBS)
- Artificial Intelligence and Cognitive Systems (KIK)

=== Faculty of Economic and Social Sciences ===
The following programmes are available in this faculty:

- Business Administration (since foundation)
- Business Informatics (since autumn 2001)
- International Management for Top Athletes (since summer 2006)
- Intercultural Management
- Digital Marketing

=== Faculty of Media Science ===
- Multimedia and Communication (since autumn 2002)
- Field-Journalism (since autumn 2008)
- Public Relations & Corporate Communication
- Media Psychology

=== Equipment and Projects ===
- member of the "High-Tech-Offensive Bayern" (Free State of Bavaria)
- sound studio
- virtual television studio with ISP
- 3D laboratory
- laboratory for non-linear cutting
- photographic studio
- plastic laboratory (for CAM/CAD simulations)
- installation of a "Center of Excellence for Plastics"
- MBA in IT-Management in cooperation with the Ingolstadt University of Applied Sciences and the University of Applied Sciences Hof.

== History ==
The Free State of Bavaria founded the university of applied sciences in the heart of Ansbach in 1996, at a site where soldiers had been trained for over 250 years. In the 18th century, a barracks was built by the margrave's master builder. Around the start of the 20th century, the barracks had been replaced by the Hindenburg-Barracks, today's red-brick building. At first this building was used by the German Reichswehr and Wehrmacht until the end of World War II in 1945. The United States Army used it for almost a half century until 1992 when the US Administration gave it to the Free State of Bavaria. The Free State of Bavaria invested over 50 million Euro in renovating the buildings and making it ready for academic use. All the buildings have been renovated with disability-friendly facilities.

== Notable Students ==
There are about 90 German Olympic athletes studying on the campus. The most famous student is probably Kati Wilhelm, a multiple Olympic and World Champion in biathlon. Other notable sportspeople who have studied on the International Management programme at the University include biathlete Michael Greis and ski jumper Severin Freund.
