= Steinmayr =

Steinmayr is a surname. Notable people with the surname include:

- Teddy Steinmayr (born 1964), Austrian long jumper
- Wolfgang Steinmayr (1944–2026), Austrian cyclist

== See also ==
- Steinmeyer, a German surname
- Frank-Walter Steinmeier (born 1956), German politician, President of Germany (2017–)
