= Georges Oberhaeuser =

German optician

- Georg Johann Oberhäuser
- Born: 16 July 1798; Ansbach, Bavaria
- Died: 10 January 1868 (aged 69); Paris, France
- Known for: Optics and Microscopes manufacturer

Georges Oberhaeuser was a German optician working in Paris in the early to middle 19th century. His contributions, and the contributions of his partner and successor, Edmund Hartnack, were part of the early development of the microscope as a scientific tool on the European continent.

== Birth and education ==
Georges Oberhaeuser was born in Ansbach, Bavaria, in 1798 to Michael Adam Oberhäuser (1755–1814), a master turner. The boy attended a university-preparatory school in Ansbach and then was apprenticed to a University of Würzburg machinist surnamed du Mouceau. After his apprenticeship, he emigrated to France, and in 1816 joined the workshop of Henri Gambey (1787–1847).

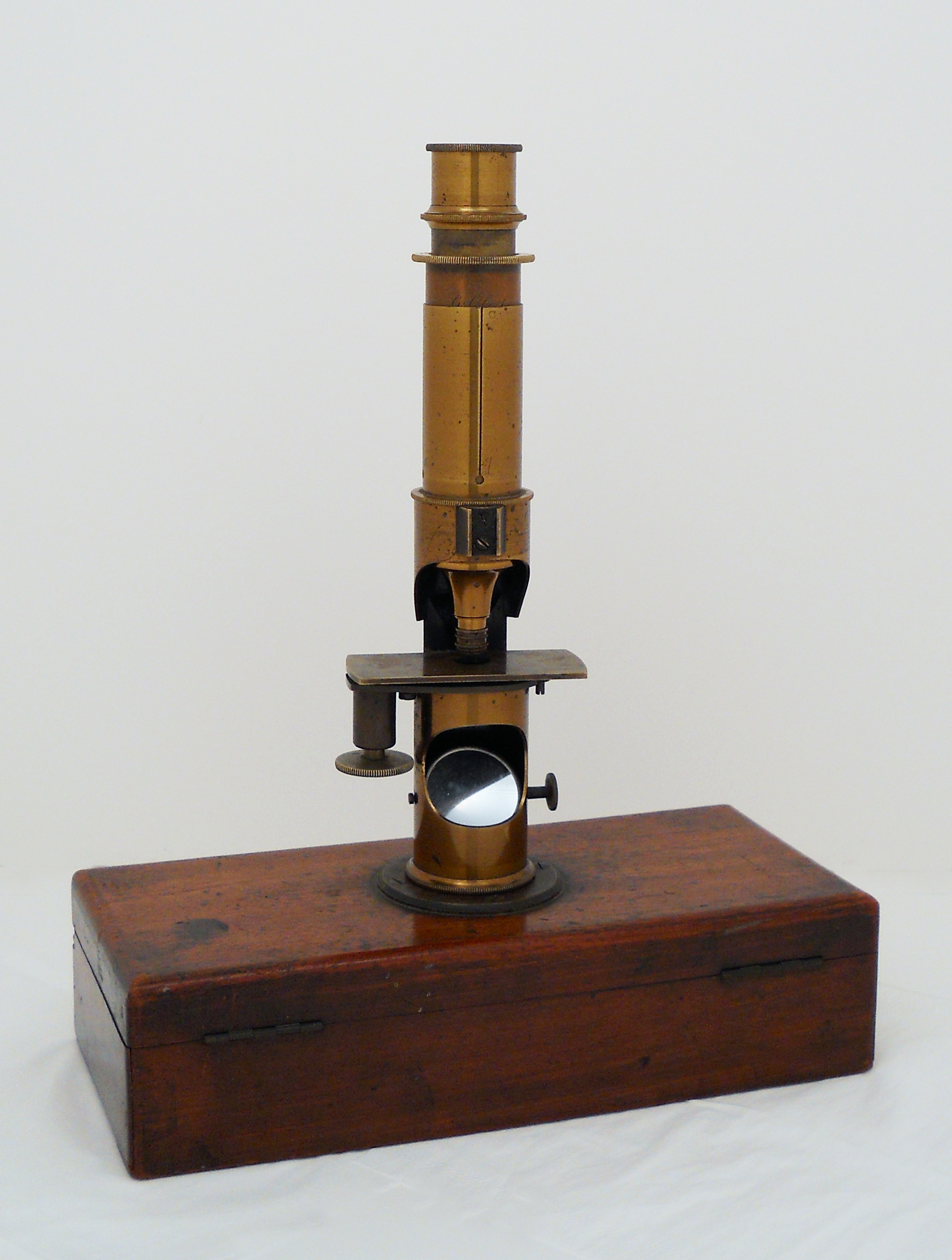
The small drum microscope of Oberhaeuser. this example about 1855.

== Microscope and optics workshop ==
Oberhaeuser's first commercial venture was during partnership with Bouquet und Achille Trécourt in 1822. Oberhaeuser produced one of his most successful early microscope designs for the student market. As research in cell biology and botany broadened, students needed a capable microscope more affordable than the complex expensive models available. The small drum microscope was the combination of a sturdy stand, based on earlier designs by Fraunhofer and Martin.

Oberhaeuser often followed the lead of Giovanni Battista Amici in development of his optical designs, including his adoption of the short 7 inch body tube and Amici's early objective designs.

The compound microscope was just being introduced to serious scientific use as the introduction of achromatic objective lenses made it superior to the simple microscope for research use. Several contemporary publications written for working research scientists and students compared the available microscopes as of their publication dates. Oberhaeuser's objective lenses were consistently judged to be very good. He adopted the system used by Amici of several lenses in fixed sequence where each lens served a purpose in correcting aberrations caused by the overall system. The lenses were not independently usable objectives. Several competitors continued to use the system described by J. J. Lister in his famous paper; stacked independent objectives. The path pioneered by Amici and Oberhaeuser proved more flexible and ultimately became the most common design used in higher magnification objectives. A modern comparison of a Dutch museum collection supports the contemporary evaluations. The later Oberhaeuser objectives show very good resolution even by modern standards.

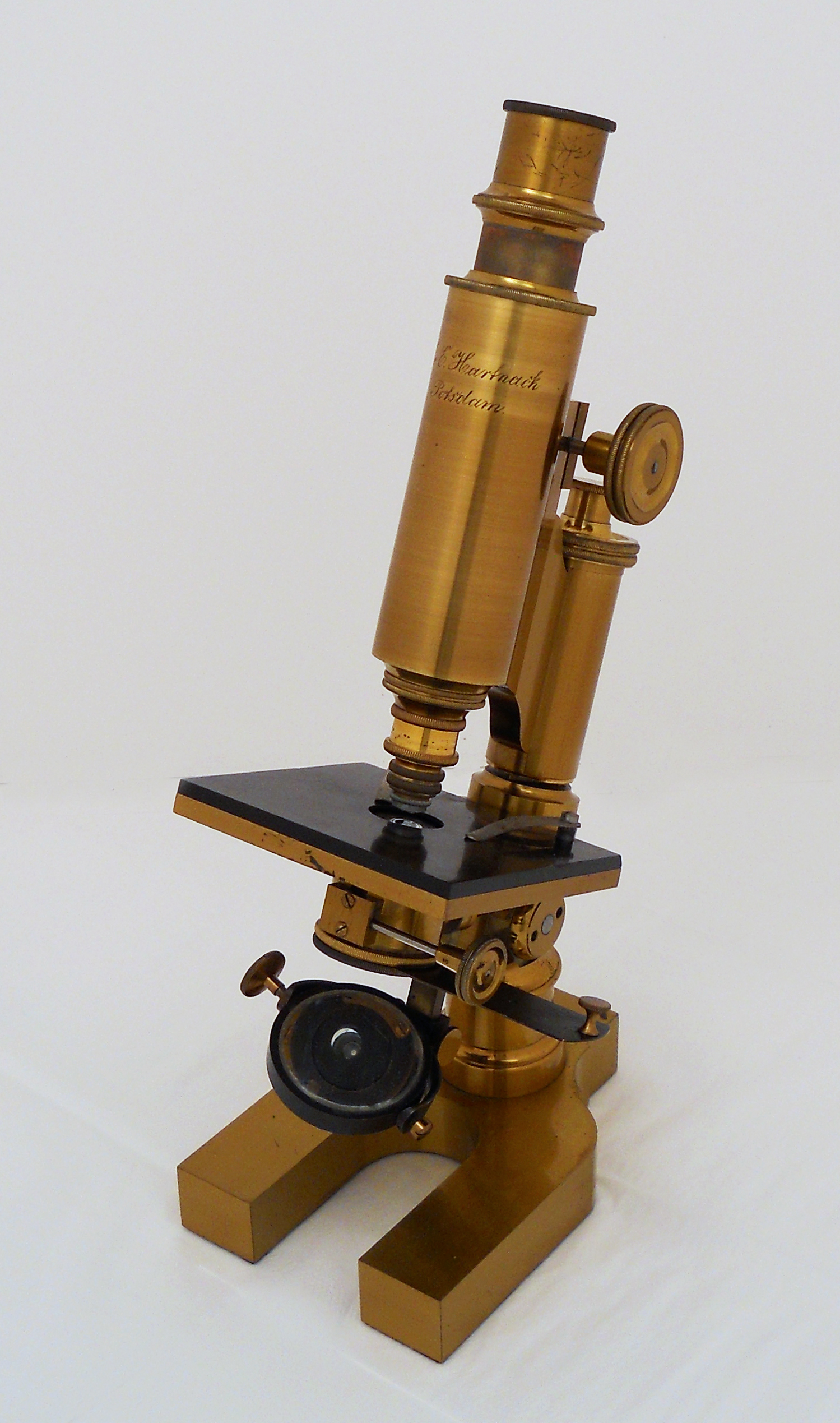
The iconic form of the Horseshoe foot design. This one by Oberhaeuser's successor Edmund Hartnack.

Oberhaeuser continued to develop stands to suit the requirements of researchers and introduced the pattern which was to shape the image of the microscope for over a century in 1854; the Oberhaeuser horseshoe foot stand.

== Retirement and a successor. Edmund Hartnack ==
Oberhaeuser appointed his nephew Edmund Hartnack a partner in the workshop in 1854 and technical director in 1860. Oberhaeuser eventually withdrew from the day-to-day business of the firm, naming Hartnack as his successor in 1864. By the late 1850s Oberhaeuser and Hartnack had already redesigned their objectives, again following the lead of Amici, to give larger usable apertures and higher resolution. The new series, including their water immersion objectives, would set the standard for excellence for several years. Georges Oberhaeuser died in Paris in 1868.
