= Hennenbach =

Coordinates: 49°18′59″N 10°34′55″E

Hennenbach is a district of the city of Ansbach in Bavaria, Germany. It forms a small part of the north-east of Ansbach.
