= Wilhelm Hecht =

German etcher and wood engraver (1843-1920)

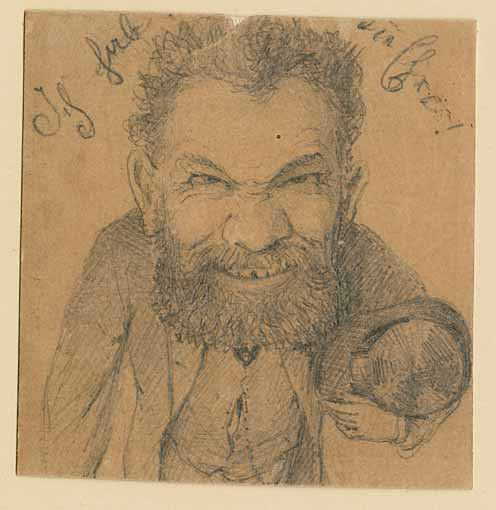
Caricature portrait of Hecht by anonymous artist

Wilhelm Hecht (28 March 1843 – early March 1920) was a German wood engraver and etcher.

== Biography ==
Hecht was born in Ansbach, Bavaria. He studied the art of wood engraving with the printmaker Döring in Nuremberg from 1857 to 1859, continued his education in larger studios in Leipzig, Berlin and Stuttgart, and in 1868 opened his own studio in Munich. In 1885 he was called to Vienna to head the newly founded xylographic department of the k.u.k. Hof- und Staatsdruckerei (Imperial and Royal State Printing Office). At the same time, he was made professor for wood engraving at the School for Applied Arts (Kunstgewerbeschule), now the Universität für angewandte Kunst Wien (University of Applied Arts Vienna). He retired to Graz, then to Munich, and in 1912 to Linz, where he died.

Hecht applied his talent and skills particularly to copy-engraving. He was assigned by the Society for Reproducing Art (Gesellschaft für vervielfältigende Kunst) in Vienna to execute several woodcuts of paintings in the Schack Gallery in Munich, leading him to devote his talents to etching, which thereafter became the almost sole focus of his artistic production.

He completed etchings of works by Schwind, Böcklin, Lenbach, Rottmann, Schleich, van Dyck und Jan van Schorel – works of art in their own right - and produced two original etchings (Emperor Wilhelm I and King Ludwig of Bavaria in the regalia of the Order of St. George, the latter in an unusual format size). He also demonstrated exceptional skills in composition techniques. Hecht made wood engravings for Grimms' Fairy Tales, Goethe's Faust (after Alexander von Liezen-Mayer), Schiller's Song of the Bell (also after Alexander von Liezen-Mayer) and for Heinrich von Kleist's The Broken Jug (after Menzel).

== Literature ==
- Eva-Maria Hanebutt-Benz: Studien zum deutschen Holzstich im 19. Jahrhundert. Frankfurt a. M.: Buchhändler-Vereinigung 1984, Sp. 1060, 1202f. ISBN 3-7657-1262-0
- Hecht, Wilhelm. In: Meyers Konversations-Lexikon, 4th edn., p. 264. Verlag des Bibliographischen Instituts, Leipzig/Wien 1885–1892 (online version)
- Hecht, Wilhelm. In: Hans Vollmer (ed.): Allgemeines Lexikon der Bildenden Künstler von der Antike bis zur Gegenwart (Thieme-Becker), Vol 16, p. 200: Hansen–Heubach. E. A. Seemann, Leipzig 1923
