= Andreas Bomba =

German music journalist

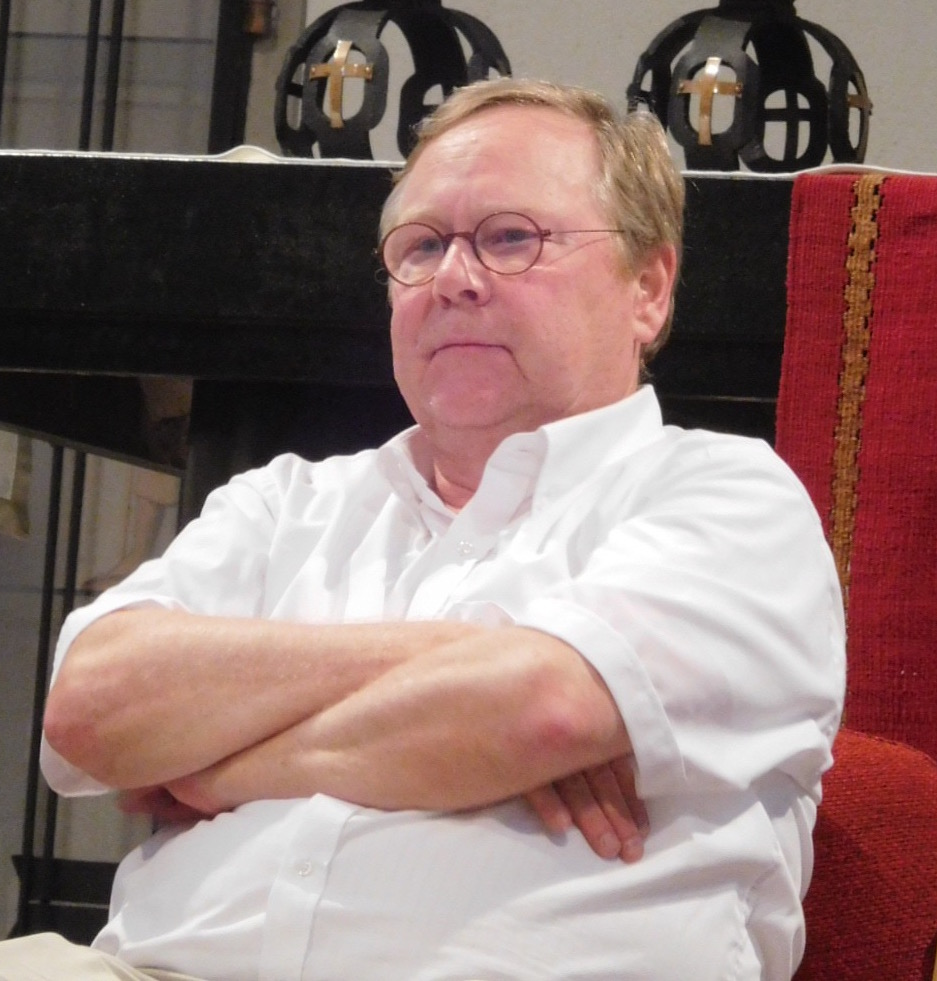
- Occupations: Writer, singer

Andreas Bomba (born 1956) is a German journalist, writer, historian, critic, and singer, the festival director of the Bachwoche Ansbach since 2006.

== Career ==
Bomba studied from 1975 to 1981 at the Johann Wolfgang Goethe University in Frankfurt and later studied Romance languages and history in Italy and France. From 1979, he worked as a music journalist, writing music reviews for various newspapers and magazines, and as a writer, critic and presenter for numerous German radio stations such as Südwestrundfunk (SWR) and Hessischer Rundfunk (hr). He has authored numerous books and papers on musical and poetic analysis. His book on the works of Bach, Die kompletten Werke von Johann Sebastian Bach, was published in 2000. From 1996 to 2000, he planned and produced for the Internationale Bachakademie Stuttgart and the label Hänssler Classic the "edition bachakademie", the first complete recording of Bach works on 172 CDs. He was appointed music director of Bachwoche Ansbach in 2006 and directed the festival's 60th anniversary in 2007.

== Selected publications ==
as editor

- "Singet se noh...?" (50 years Gächinger Kantorei 1954–2004). Internationale Bachakademie Stuttgart. 2004.
- Bolín, Norbert; Bomba, Andreas (2006). Musikland Baden-Württemberg: Basis und Spitze. Kohlhammer Verlag. ISBN 978-3-17-019428-1.
