= 412th Aviation Support Battalion =

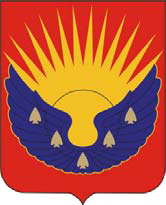
- Coat of arms
- Active: 2006 – 2015
- Country: United States
- Allegiance: United States Army
- Branch: Active Army
- Type: Support Battalion
- Role: Support
- Size: Battalion
- Part of: 12th Combat Aviation Brigade
- Garrison/HQ: Shipton Kaserne, Ansbach, Germany
- Nickname: Professionals
- Motto: "Professionals - Always!"
- Anniversaries: 7 August (Birthday)
- Engagements: Operation Iraqi Freedom; Operation Enduring Freedom
- Decorations: 3 Meritorious Unit Commendations

Commanders
- Previous: LTC Richard E. Crogan II (2006-2007); LTC George Hamontree (2007-2009); LTC Kenneth Kliethermes (2009-2011); LTC John A. McAfee (2011-2013); LTC David Almquist (2013-2015)

Insignia
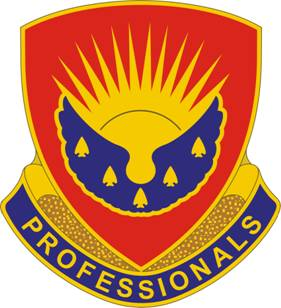
- Distinctive unit insignia

The 412th Aviation Support Battalion was an Aviation Support Battalion under 12th Combat Aviation Brigade, Katterbach, Germany.

== History ==
On 7 August 2006, the 601st Aviation Support Battalion and the 7th Battalion, 159th Aviation Regiment (7-159 AVN) were combined and re-designated as the 412th Aviation Support Battalion. Stationed at Shipton Kaserne, the new battalion was assigned to the 12th Combat Aviation Brigade, based in Katterbach, Germany.

The Battalion was structured into 4 Companies providing Maintenance, Logistical, and Communications support to all elements of the 12th Combat Aviation Brigade

Companies

Headquarters and Support Company (HSC)- Hornets

Alpha Company - Workhorse - Logistics

Bravo Company - Barbarians - Aviation Maintenance Support

Charlie Company - Crusaders - Communications

== Deployments ==
In July 2007 the 12th Combat Aviation Brigade, including the 412th ASB, deployed to LSA Anaconda, Iraq. The 412th ASB was at the center of 12th CAB's logistic support, but in December 2007, the 12th CAB was transferred to Camp Taji, Iraq. The 412th ASB remained at LSA Anaconda, and was attached to Task Force 49 from Alaska. In September 2008, the 12th CAB along with 412th ASB redeployed to Katterbach, Germany. For providing excellent support to Task Force XII and Task Force 49, the battalion received several awards and honors. Among these were the LTG Ellis D. Parker Award, the AAAA Aviation Logistics Award, the Deployment Excellence Award: Big Unit Category (Army-wide), and two Meritorious Unit Citations.

In November 2009 the 412th ASB deployed to Iraq for a second time. For the duration of OIF 10-12 the 412th ASB was the sole Aviation Support Battalion in United States Division South (USD-S). For their performance the 412th ASB was awarded a third Meritorious Unit Citation.

In April 2012 the 412th ASB was deployed to Mazar-i-Sharif (RC-NORTH), Afghanistan. As part of the surge reduction, much of the Battalion redeployed to Germany in August 2012, with Elements from all Companies remaining behind as part of Task Force Ready for the duration of the deployment. As part of TF Ready, the unit received the German Unit Citation the Fahnenband, the highest unit honor awarded by Germany. German President Joachim Gauck personally presented the award to the unit at a ceremony on December 19, 2013 at Mazar-i-Sharif.

== Inactivation ==
On 21 July 2015, 412th ASB was officially inactivated during a ceremony at Katterbach Army Airfield. The unit was deactivated following a restructuring of Army aviation units. Parts of 412th ASB, were redesignated as the 5th Aviation Maintenance Detachment of the 603rd Aviation Support Battalion, which was also deactivated 28 Aug 2017. 5th Aviation Maintenance Detachment was merged into Delta Company 1st Battalion - 3rd Attack Reconnaissance Battalion. 12th CAB.
