= St. Johannis, Ansbach =

Coordinates: 49°18′11.3″N 10°34′14.6″E

St. Johannis
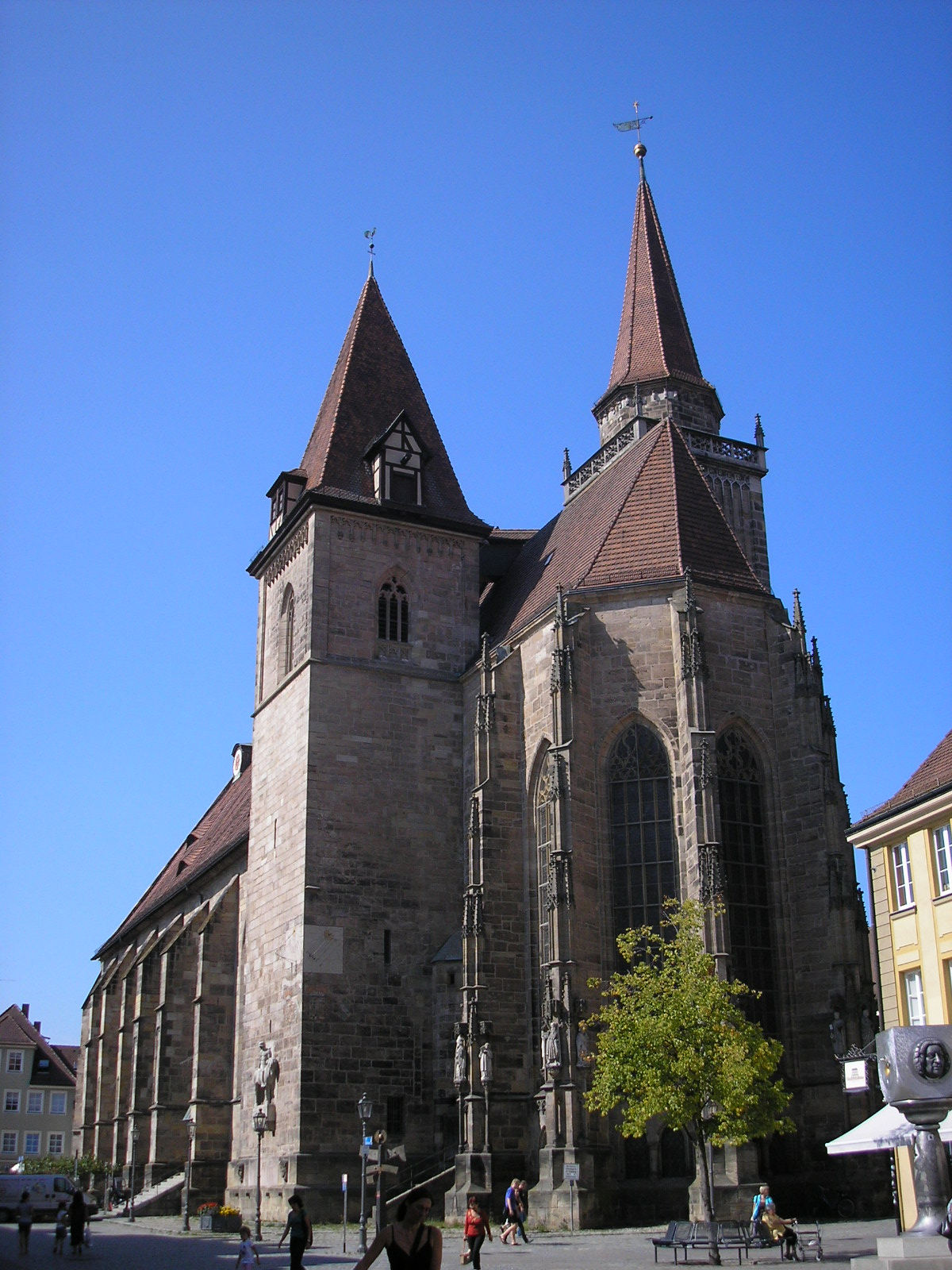
- St. Johannis
- Location: Ansbach
- Country: Germany
- Denomination: Lutheran
- Previous denomination: Catholic
- Website: innenstadtkirchen-ansbach.de/kirche-st-gumbertus

History
- Status: Parish church

Architecture
- Functional status: Active
- Style: Gothic
- Years built: 12th century

Administration
- Division: Lutheran Church of Bavaria

The church St. Johannis (St. John) in Ansbach, Middle Franconia, Germany, is a Lutheran parish church and a concert venue of the Bachwoche Ansbach.

== History ==
The parish was first mentioned in documents in 1139. It was given by the Bishop of Würzburg to St. Gumbertus. Construction began in the second decade of the 15th century. The church has three aisles, the nave was completed in 1435. The two towers of different height and roofing are probably from the same period, typical of Ansbach. The church built in Gothic architecture has two “unequal towers”, as is common in churches in Ansbach. The construction of the choir began in 1441. The nave is connected with the choir to a spatial unit. The northern long side faces the market. The church is built of sandstone.

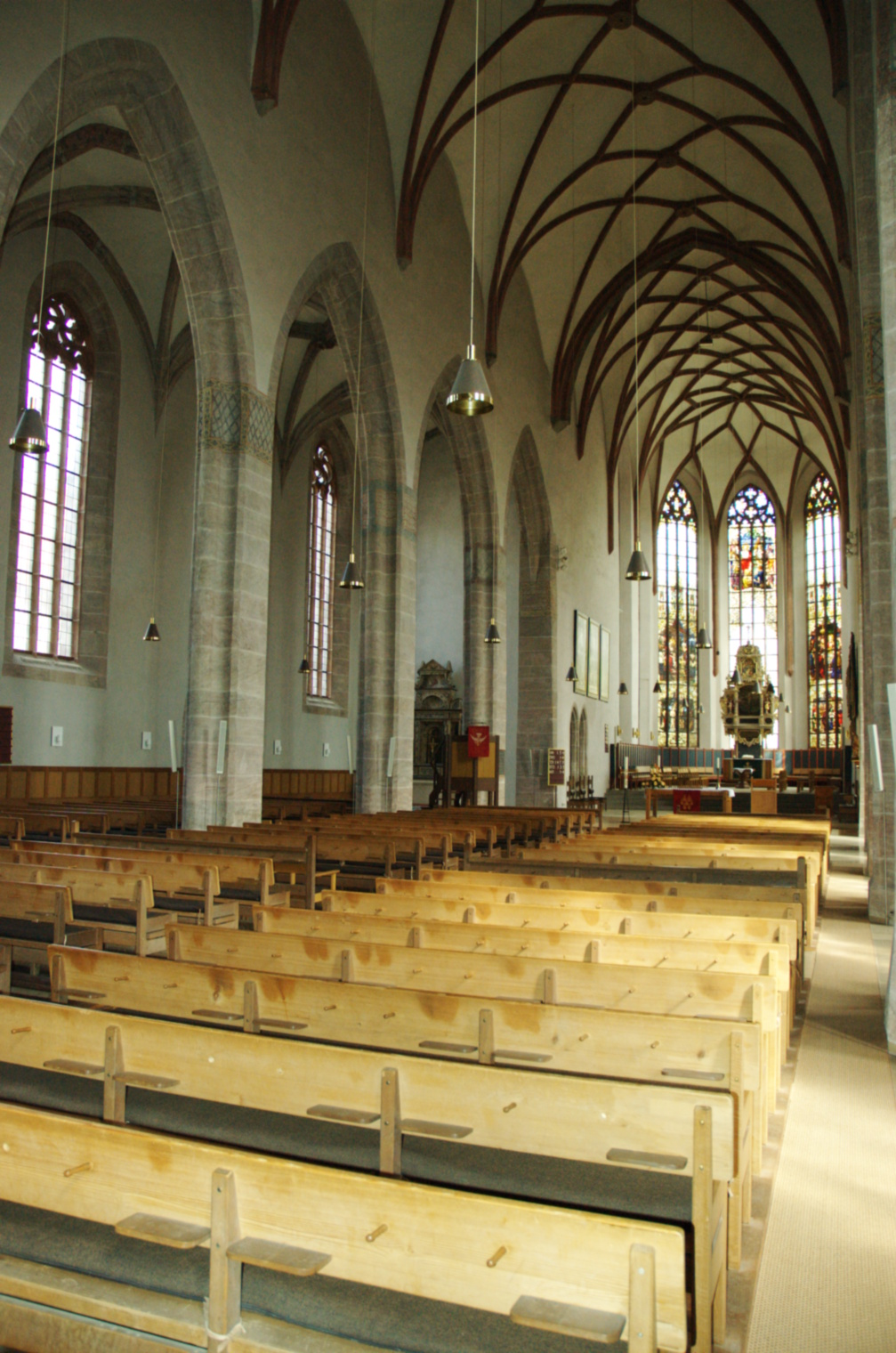
Interior

The organ was built in 1962 by the organ builder Rieger (Schwarzach, Austria), and restored in 1991 by the organ builder Mühleisen (Leonberg). The church is a concert venue of the Bachwoche Ansbach, among others.

Johann Rurer, who spread the Lutheran ideas of Protestant Church reformation and who was the town priest of Ansbach, held his first service at St. Johannis Church on 9 April 1525.

The Military Church records (Microfilm no. 164) were found in the Military Chaplaincy of St. Johannis Church at Ansbach.

The crypt of the church houses the funeral chapel of the margraves and margravines who used to worship at the St. Johanis Church. The caskets in which they are buried are made of materials such as bronze and copper and marble and covered with “black samite draperies”. The coffins are arranged in a “hemicycle” and include the small coffins of children; two of the coffins are engraved, one engraving is made of bronze which raises the effigy of the child and the other has an epitaph for the princes who died young when one year old. The epitaph reads:

“In the Rose-month was this sweet Rose taken.
For the Rose-kind hath she earth forsaken.
The Princess is the Rose, that here no longer blows,
From the stem by death’s hand rudely shaken.
Then rest in the Rose-house.
Little Princess Rosebud dear!
There life’s Rose shall bloom again in heavens sunshine clear.”
