= Theater Ansbach =

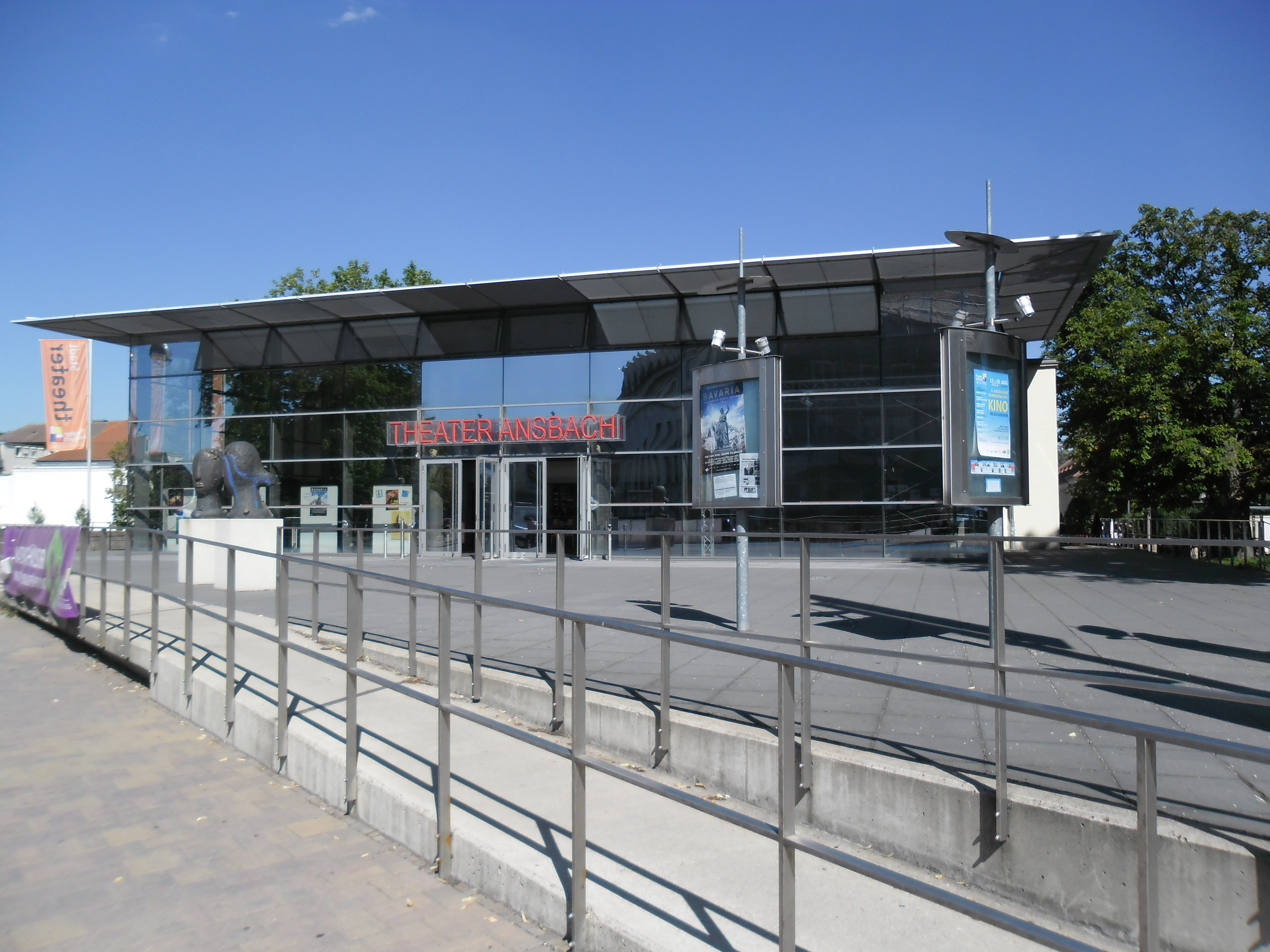
Theater Ansbach

Theater Ansbach is a theatre company in Ansbach, Bavaria, Germany. It was founded in 2007 by the Ansbacher cooperative "Kultur im Schloss" (Culture in the Palace) with playwright Jürgen Eick as its director. It includes divisions for concert and cinema. Its first season started 26 September 2008. The season included 11 in-house productions. From 2015 to 2020, Susanne Schulz was the artistic director of Theater Ansbach. Since the summer of 2020, Axel Krauße has run the theatre.
