= Steinmeyer =

Steinmeyer is a surname. Notable people with the surname include:

- Elias von Steinmeyer (1848–1922), German philologist
- Ferdinand Steinmeyer (1720–1786), German Jesuit missionary in Northern America
- Jim Steinmeyer (born 1958), American magic consultant
- Mike Steinmeyer, American politician

== See also ==
- Frank-Walter Steinmeier (born 1956), German politician
- Steinmayr, a surname
