= Gächinger Kantorei =

German mixed choir

- Choir
- Founded: 1954
- Founder: Helmuth Rilling
- Genre: Mixed concert choir
- Members: 200
- Chief conductor: Hans-Christoph Rademann
- Headquarters: Stuttgart
- Affiliation: Internationale Bachakademie Stuttgart
- Website: www.bachakademie.de/de/gaechinger-cantorey.html

Gächinger Kantorei (Gächingen Chorale) is an internationally known German mixed choir, founded by Helmuth Rilling in 1954 in Gächingen (part of St. Johann close to Reutlingen) and conducted by him until 2013, succeeded by Hans-Christoph Rademann. In 2016 they began to use the old German spelling of its name, Gaechinger Cantorey.

A "Kantorei" is a choir of high standard dedicated mostly, but not exclusively, to sacred music. The ensemble operates in Stuttgart now and was therefore officially named Gächinger Kantorei Stuttgart. The choir has up to 200 voices, called together for projects from Germany and Switzerland, most of them singers with a degree in music. Since 1965 they have performed music with orchestra, the Bach-Collegium Stuttgart, including several first performances.

== History ==
Initially the choir was dedicated to a cappella music of the 16th, 17th and 20th century, later adding works from the Romantic period. In 1965 Rilling founded the orchestra Bach-Collegium Stuttgart, and both groups started performing choral music with orchestra.

The first international tours were conducted in the 1960s to the (then) DDR, CSSR and Hungary, the first tour to the United States followed in 1968. In 1976 the choir sang with the Israel Philharmonic Orchestra the first performance in Israel of Brahms's Ein deutsches Requiem. Tours of the 1980s took the group to Poland and Moscow.

Gächinger Kantorei and Bach-Collegium Stuttgart have performed at festivals such as the Musikfest Stuttgart of the Internationale Bachakademie Stuttgart, Salzburg Festival, Lucerne Festival and the Prague Spring. In 2004 they celebrated their 50th year by performing Bach's Mass in B minor at the Oregon Bach Festival. They have appeared at the Rheingau Musik Festival and recorded Mozart's Great Mass in C Minor in 2006.

== Music ==
During the first years the Gächinger Kantorei performed a cappella works of Buxtehude, Schütz, Pachelbel, Lasso, Hassler, Bach, Caspar Othmayr and Leonhard Lechner, and music of 20th century composers such as Hugo Distler, Paul Hindemith, Kurt Hessenberg, Willy Burkhard, including premieres of works by Johann Nepomuk David, Evangelienmotetten (motets on the Gospel) in 1959 and Psalm 139 in 1961.

Gächinger Kantorei and Bach-Collegium Stuttgart, conducted by Rilling, completed the first complete recording of Bach's cantatas and oratorios, a project of 15 years in collaboration with the Hänssler Verlag, on 21 March 1985, the composer's 300th birthday. The recording was awarded a Grand Prix du Disque.

The choir premiered works such as the Messa per Rossini (1988), Arvo Pärt's Litany (1994), the Requiem of Reconciliation (1995) and Wolfgang Rihm's Deus Passus (Passionsstücke nach Lukas) in 2000 and Creatio in 2009. They explored different repertoire in 2004, in a premiere performance and recording of Mendelsohn's opera Die beiden Neffen.

Gächinger Kantorei have also performed new versions of works, such as Mozart's unfinished Great Mass in C minor completed by Robert D. Levin. In 2009 they performed Bach's Christmas Oratorio at the Thomaskirche where it had been premiered 275 years before.

The choir has performed with notable guest conductors such as Masaaki Suzuki. Krzysztof Penderecki conducted his Credo on the occasion of Rilling's 70th birthday, 29 May 2003, with the Radio-Sinfonieorchester Stuttgart, programmed with Bach's setting of these words in the Symbolum Nicenum from his Mass in B minor, Rilling conducting Gächinger Kantorei and Bach-Collegium Stuttgart with Sibylla Rubens, Ingeborg Danz and Christian Gerhaher. Sir Roger Norrington chose the choir for his recording of Beethoven's Symphony No. 9 with Camilla Nylund, Iris Vermillion, Jonas Kaufmann, Franz-Josef Selig and the Radio-Sinfonieorchester Stuttgart. Ton Koopman conducted Haydn's The Seasons with soloists Klara Ek, Jörg Dürmüller and Klaus Mertens in 2009.

In 2009 the Gächinger Kantorei sang with the New York Philharmonic Handel's Messiah in Avery Fisher Hall in New York, conducted by Rilling with soloists Annette Dasch, Daniel Taylor, James Taylor and Shenyang.

== Literature ==
- Andreas Bomba (ed.): „Singet se noh...?“ (50 years Gächinger Kantorei 1954–2004). Internationale Bachakademie, Stuttgart 2004

== Interactive Hypermedia ==
- Johann Sebastian Bach Mass in B Minor (Flash)
