= Ansbach Residence =

Palace of the Margraves of Brandenburg-Ansbach

Coordinates: 49°18′11″N 10°34′33″E

- Residenz Ansbach
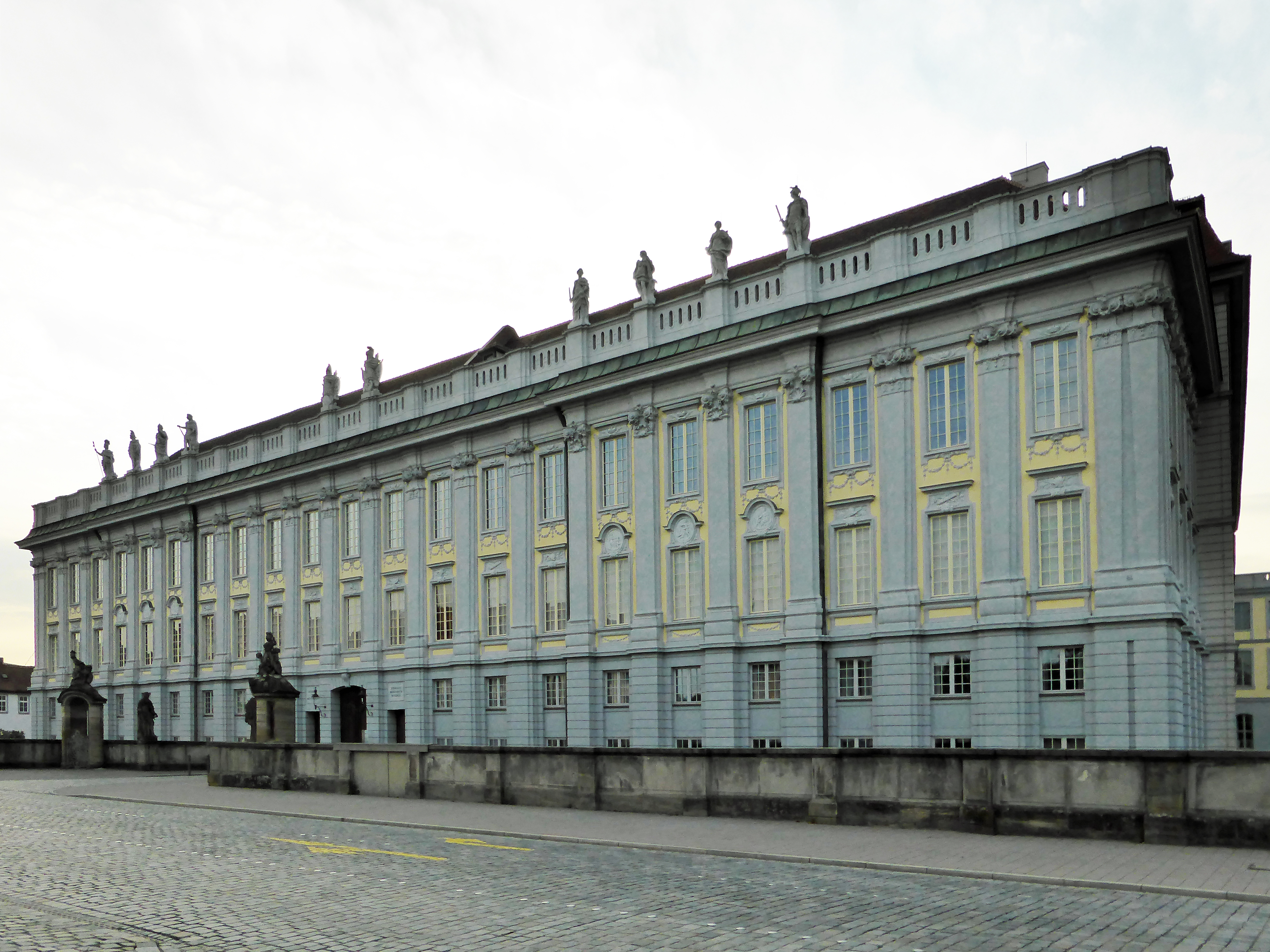
- Interactive map of the Ansbach Residence area
- Alternative names: Markgrafenschloß (Margrave's Palace)

General information
- Architectural style: Renaissance style
- Construction started: 1565
- Construction stopped: 1575
- Renovated: 1694–1716, 1719–1730, 1731–1749

Design and construction
- Architect: Blasius Berwart
- Other designers: Gabriel de Gabrieli; Karl Friedrich von Zocha; Leopold Retti

Ansbach Residence (Residenz Ansbach), also known as Margrave's Palace (Markgrafenschloss), is a palace in Ansbach, Germany. It was the government seat of the Margrave of Brandenburg-Ansbach. Today it is the administrative seat of the government of Middle Franconia. The Great Hall and the Orangerie in its garden serve as venues for the biennial music festival Bachwoche Ansbach.

== History ==
The palace was developed from a medieval building. From 1398 to 1400 Frederick I, Elector of Brandenburg, expanded a Stiftshof outside the city walls to a water castle. Structural remains are preserved in the northwest wing of the present building.

George Frederick, Margrave of Brandenburg-Ansbach, ordered the Swabian architect Blasius Berwart (his chief architect from 1563 to 1580) to build a palace. It was erected in Renaissance style from 1565 to 1575. A large hall was built from 1565 to 1575, now called the "Gothische Halle" (Gothic Hall) because of its rib vault. It now houses the largest collection of fayence and porcelain of the former "Ansbacher Manufaktur".

A century later, the major construction was done by Gabriel de Gabrieli (1694–1716), by Karl Friedrich von Zocha (1719–1730), and by Leopold Retti (1731–1749). Between 1705 and 1738 the building was changed to its present form.

== Architecture ==
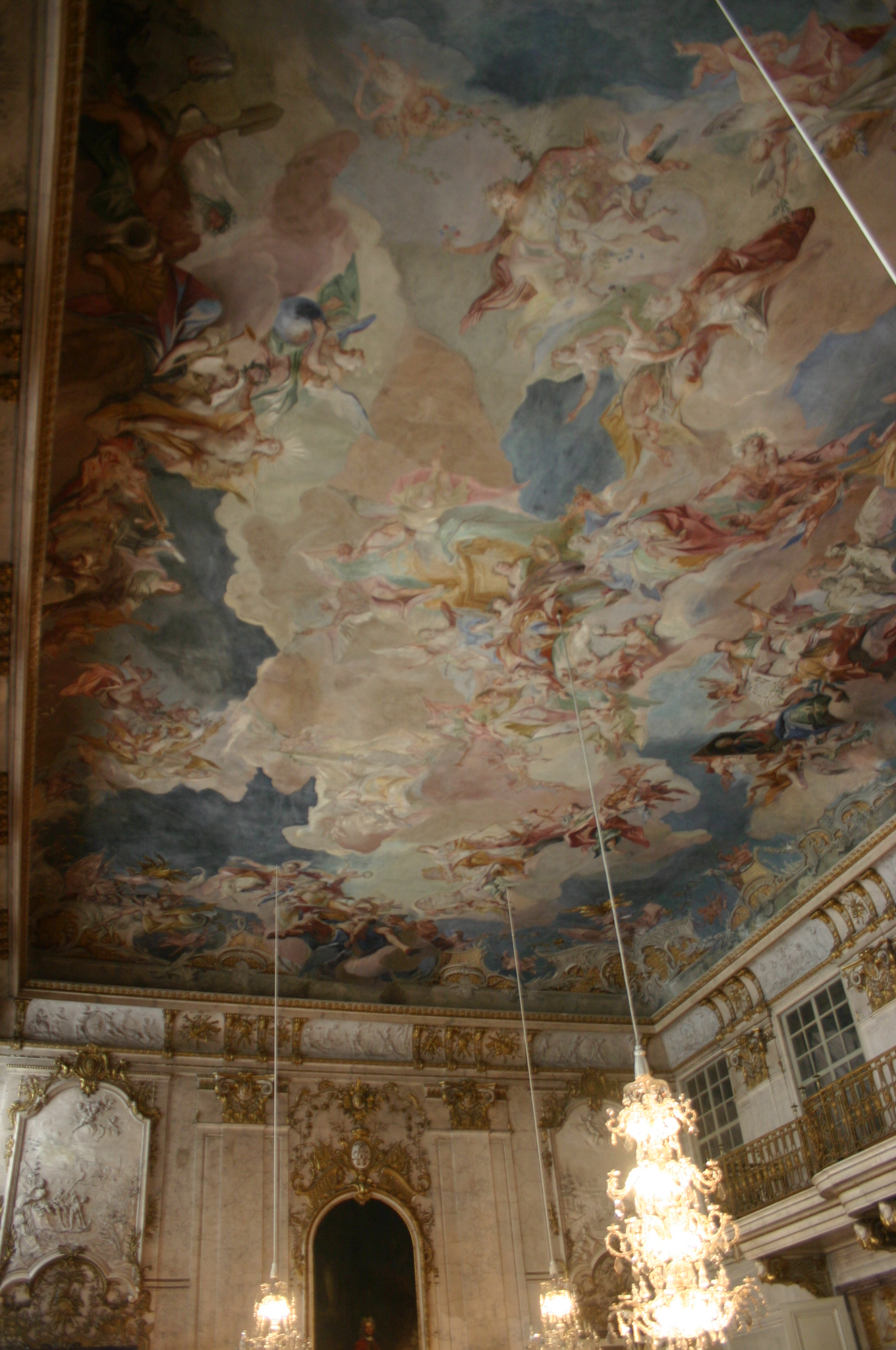
Festsaal, ceiling painting by Carlo Carlone

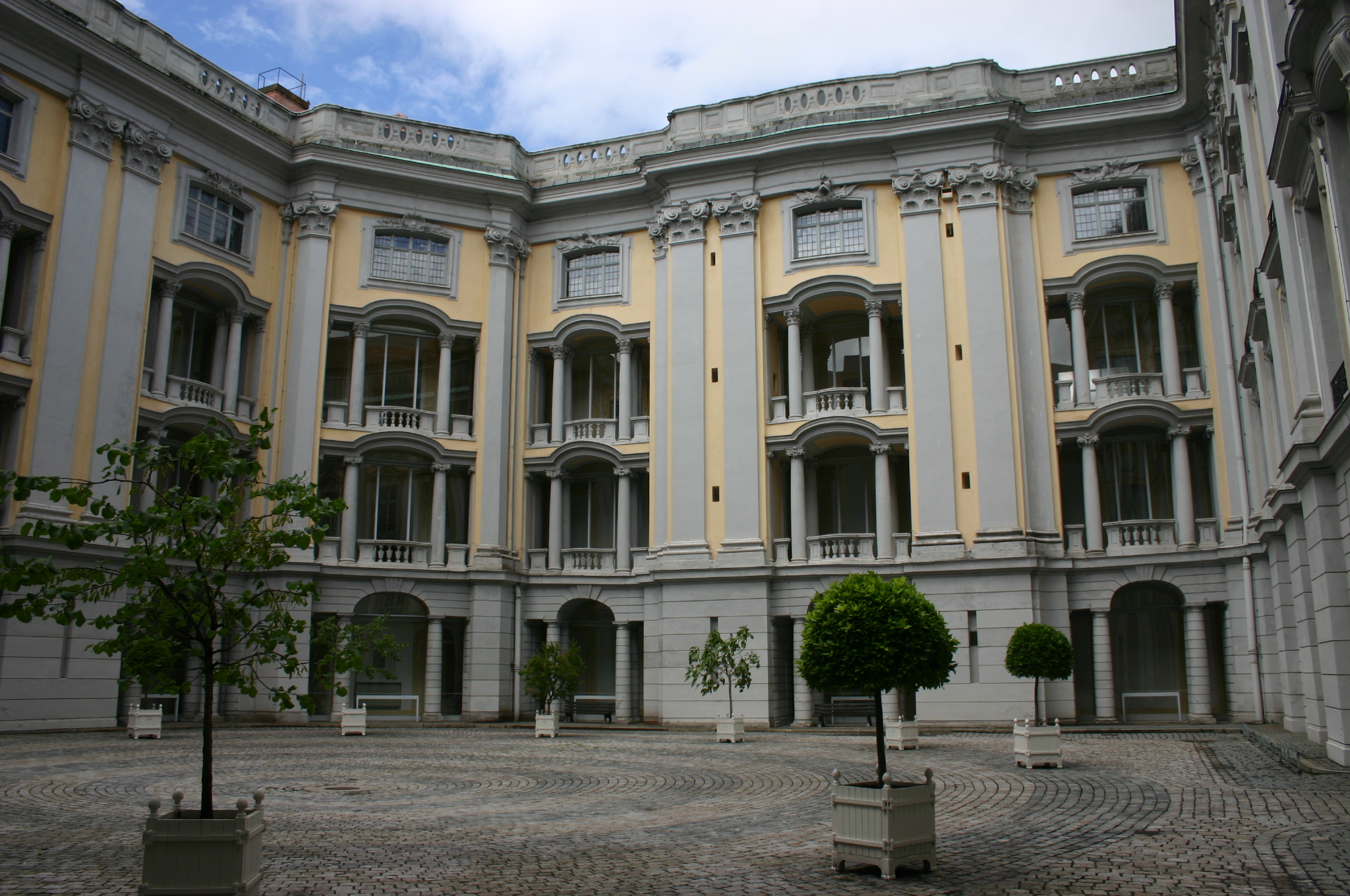
Inner court

Gabriel de Gabrieli created before 1709 the southeast wing with the main facade in a style similar to Viennese Baroque. The interior dates from 1734 to 1745 under architect Leopoldo Retti. Carlo Carlone created a fresco on the ceiling of the Festsaal (Festive hall). Meissen porcelain is shown in the Spiegelkabinett (Hall of Mirrors).

The interior of the palace has a hall of mirrors with French rococo features; the great hall was provided with painted ceiling and the rooms were fitted with Ansbach porcelain tiles of 18th century vintage. It had a garden that was laid out in the 16th century and modified in the 18th century with an orangerie.

The castle has richly furnished state rooms on the first floor. In 1791, Karl August von Hardenberg, Prussia's representative in Ansbach, added board rooms and a library. From 1806, once the Royal Bavarian Government of Rezatkreis started functioning in Ansbach, the castle's first floor rooms were converted into offices, while the rooms on other floors remained unchanged. Between 1962 and 1974, the last major renovations to the castle were completed. The Bavarian Administration of State-owned Palaces, Gardens and Lakes is in charge of the buildings and the museum.

== Orangery and garden ==
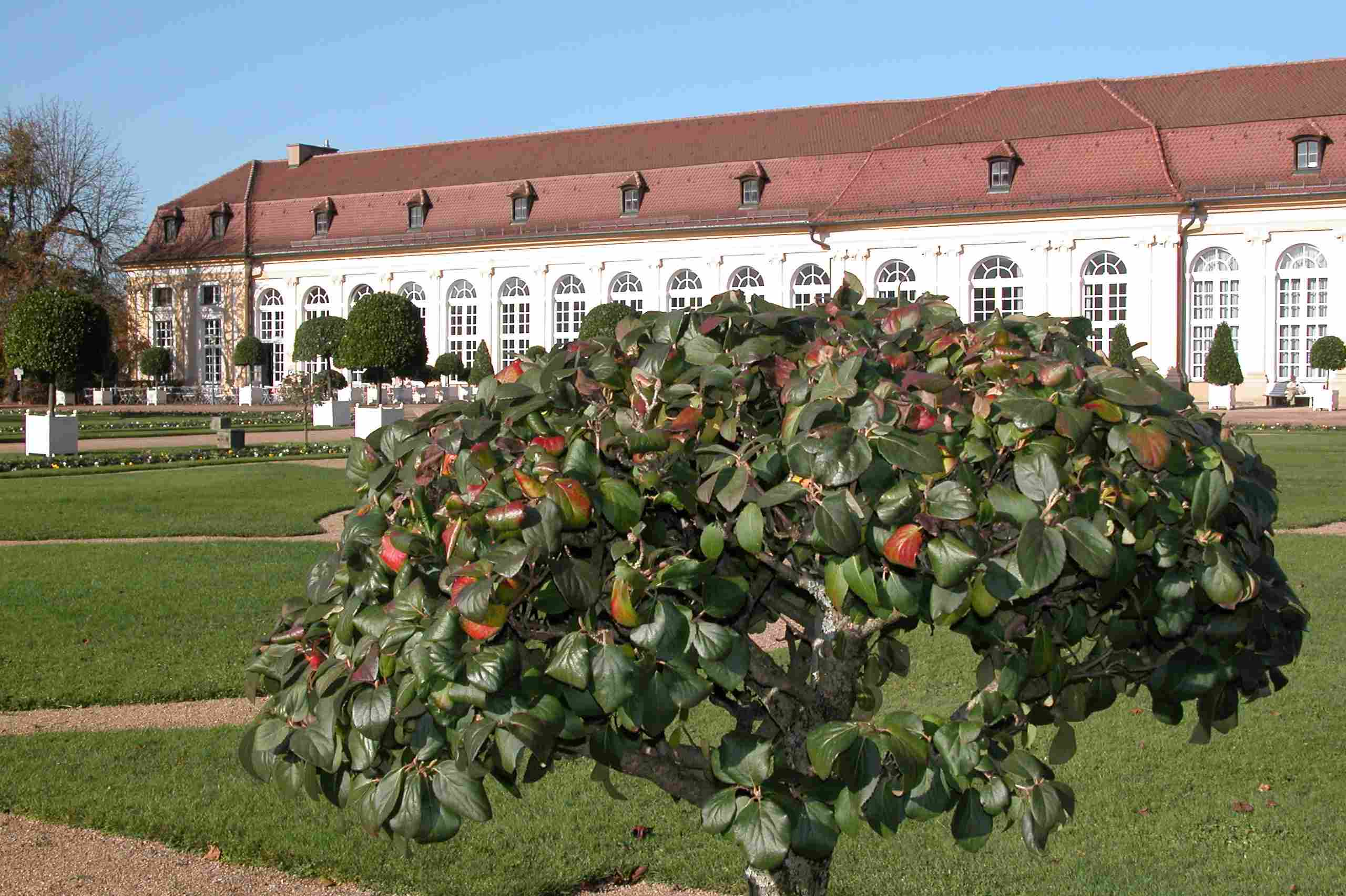
Garden

A garden was first mentioned in the 16th century in the herbal accounts of Leonhart Fuchs. Between 1723 and 1750, it was designed as a Baroque garden. Severely damaged during World War II, it was reconstructed after the war, including an herb garden with many medicinal plants and a house to keep potted plants in winter.

Chief architect Carl Friedrich von Zocha created an Orangerie as an architectural center of the gardens. It was begun in 1726, but seems to have been incomplete when Frederick the Great visited in September 1743.

On 14 December 1833 Kaspar Hauser suffered a fatal stab wound in the backyard garden. At the site a small gothic pillar is engraved "HIC OCCULTUS OCCULTO OCCISUS EST" (Here a stranger was killed by an unknown person).

Not far away, in 1825 a monument to the poet Johann Peter Uz was Ansbach (1720-1796) built with a bronze bust by Carl Alexander Heideloff. The inscription on the stele-like pedestal reads: "THE WISE, THE POET, THE PEOPLE'S FRIEND FROM HIS ADMIRERS".

The Orangerie and its courtyard host the annual Rococo Festival, showing life in the court at the time of Margrave Carl Wilhelm Friedrich von Brandenburg-Ansbach.

== Literature ==
- Rembrant Fiedler: Zur Tätigkeit des Baumeisters Gabriel de Gabrieli in Wien und Ansbach. Bamberg 1993 (Dissertation University of Würzburg)
- Christoph Graf von Pfeil: Die Möbel der Residenz Ansbach. Verwaltung der Staatlichen Schlösser, Gärten und Seen, Kataloge der Kunstsammlungen. Prestel: München/London/New York 1999. ISBN 3-7913-2078-5
- Christoph Graf von Pfeil: Residenz Ansbach mit Hofgarten und Orangerie. Verwaltung der Staatlichen Schlösser, Gärten und Seen. München 2005; ISBN 3-932982-58-4
- Josef Maier: Residenzschloß Ansbach. Gestalt und Ausstattung im Wandel der Zeit. Yearbook of the Historischer Verein für Mittelfranken 100. Ansbach 2005. ISBN 3-87707-660-2
- Wolfgang Wüst: Leben zwischen höfischem Luxus und ökonomischer Enge. Die Residenzen der Bischöfe von Augsburg und der fränkischen Hohenzollern im Absolutismus, in: Zeitschrift des Historischen Vereins für Schwaben 99 (2006) ps. 111–134. ISBN 3-89639-558-0
