= Wallace Barracks =

Former German and U.S. Army installation

Coordinates: 48.813333°N 9.210833°E

Wallace Barracks is a former German and U.S. Army installation in the Bad Cannstatt district of Stuttgart, Germany. It is located just below the Burgholzhof, near Robinson Barracks and the former Grenadier Kaserne on the site of a former Roman military camp commonly referred to in literature as Kastell Cannstatt (Citadel Cannstatt).

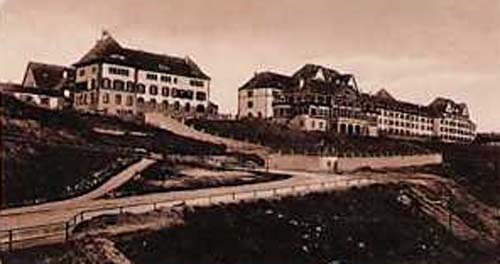
Dragoner Kaserne circa 1910

== History ==
Around 100 CE, the Romans built the first stone fort on the site- a strategic location on the Neckar River with road connections to Mainz, Augsburg and Strasbourg. It is thought to have been an administrative district capital. The Romans left the area around 259/260 CE.

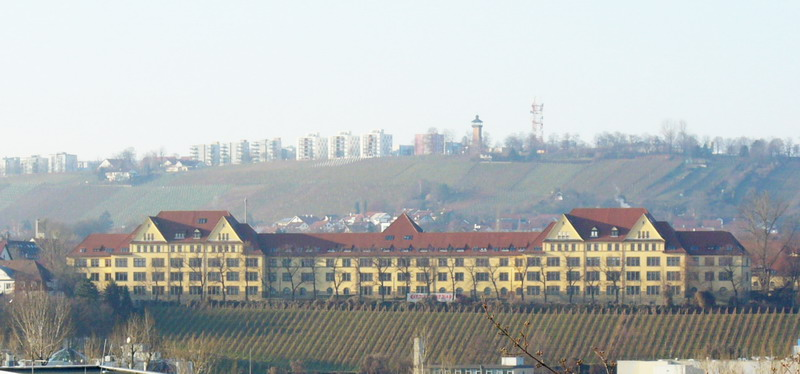
The former Wallace Barracks viewed from across the Neckar River

In 1908 the German Army built a Cavalry Barracks (Dragoner Kaserne/Reiter Kaserne) on the site which is the basis for the buildings on the site today. From that time until the end of World War II, the site hosted units of the Reichswehr and Wehrmacht (German Army). Among the units assigned during that time were units of Cavalry Regiment 18.

=== Cold War era ===
During the Cold War various Army units were located at Wallace Barracks, named for posthumous Medal of Honor recipient PFC Herman C. Wallace. The 66th Counter Intelligence Corps Group used the installation during the 1950s and referred to it as Hallschlag University. The unit was later reorganized as the 66th Military Intelligence Group (66thMI Gp) in the 1960s. The Army relocated the MI operations to Munich in 1968 from Stuttgart. Late in the US use of the site it was used as a storage facility.

=== 1992 to present ===
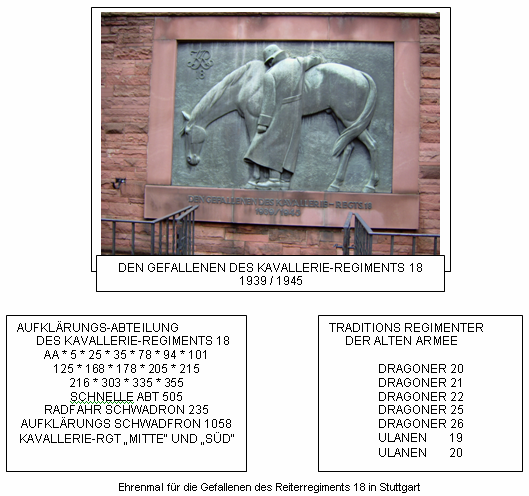
Memorial to fallen German World War II Cavalry Troops at the former Wallace Barracks

After the withdrawal of US forces from Wallace Barracks with the withdrawal of VII Corps from Germany, the site was returned to the German government. It has been retained in its former, historic form and has been redeveloped as Römerkastell- a mixed use development.

== See also ==
- Kelley Barracks
- Nellingen Kaserne
- Patch Barracks
- Robinson Barracks
- Grenadier Kaserne
- Panzer Kaserne
- List of United States Army installations in Germany
