= Grenadier Kaserne =

Former United States military base in Stuttgart, Germany

Grenadier Kaserne was a military base of U.S. in the northern Stuttgart district of Bad Cannstatt in Germany adjacent to Robinson Barracks.

== History ==
The military use of the site began in 1927 with the construction of a training ground named Flandern for the German Army's 119th Infantry Regiment. In 1934, an adjacent farm was impounded and barracks were constructed which later became Grenadier Kaserne. After World War II the U.S. Army operated Grenadier Kaserne through the end of the Cold War, largely as a logistical support base for the Stuttgart Military Community – which covered 13 installations over an area the size of Rhode Island and over 32,000 soldiers and civilian staff.

After the fall of the Berlin Wall, the United States began to reduce forces in Europe, including the 1992 deactivation of VII Corps, headquartered in Stuttgart at Kelley Barracks and responsible for almost all activities in Stuttgart excepting United States European Command at Patch Barracks. In 1993, the United States Army returned the installation to the German government, and it was redeveloped. All of the former installation's buildings were torn down saving one for use by the police as part of the redevelopment.

One of the favorite Gasthäuser in the area was called Linde Gasthaus. It was a favorite of the soldiers stationed at Grenadier as well as the German, Italian and Turkish workers at Porsche and Mercedes Benz. It was at the bottom of the hill in Zuffenhausen at 2 Freisen Str. It appears from the on-line picture (2013) that it has not changed since being built in the late 1950s.

In the early 1960s there were a variety of US military units as well as German civilian groups located at Grenadier. Two of the US units were the 594th Transportation Group, 5th Regional Movement Control Office and the 66th Military Intelligence which shared building 4. There was also a small Stars and Stripes office in the basement. The German employment office (which hired German civilians to work on US military bases) was located there as well. There was a small motor pool that was aligned with the German engineers who were based there. The engineer unit was composed of German civilians whose job it was to maintain US military buildings throughout the Stuttgart military community.

== See also ==
- Kelley Barracks
- Patch Barracks
- Panzer Kaserne
- Robinson Barracks
- Wallace Barracks
- VII Corps (United States)
