= Stuttgart High School (Germany) =

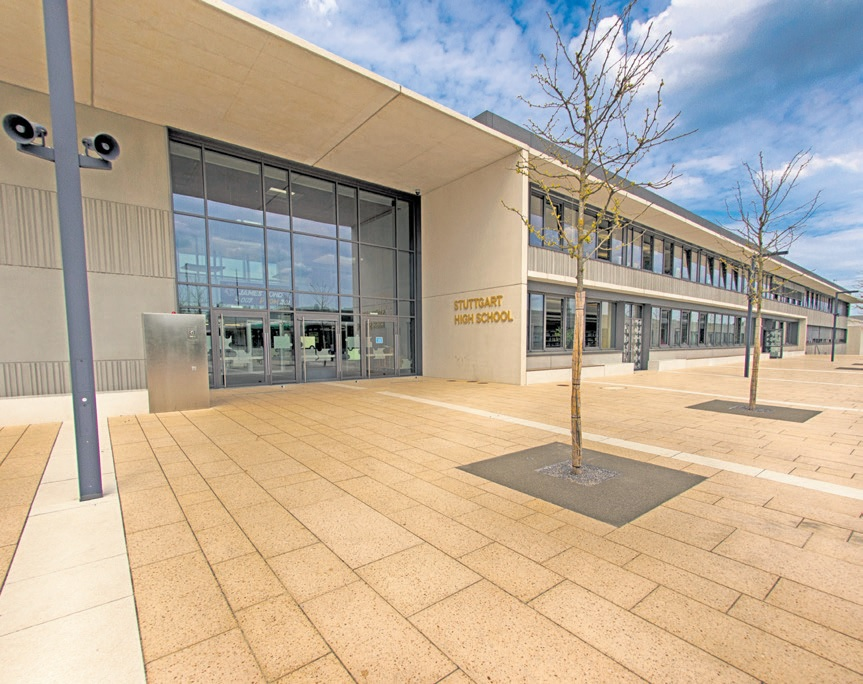
- Stuttgart High School in 2020

Location
- Panzer Kaserne; Böblingen, Baden-Württemberg, Germany
- 48°41′01″N 9°03′14″E

Information
- Former name: Patch American High School (PAHS) (1979–2015, on Patch Barracks)
- Type: DoDEA high school
- Established: 2015; 11 years ago
- Authority: Department of Defense Education Activity (DoDEA)
- CEEB code: 576325
- Principal: Seth Stillman
- Grades: 9–12
- Enrollment: 753
- Colors: Black and Gold
- Mascot: Panther
- Yearbook: Zeitgeist
- Website: stuttgarths.dodea.edu

Location in Germany

Stuttgart High School (SHS) is an English-language high school in southwest Germany, in Baden-Württemberg. Southwest of Stuttgart on Panzer Kaserne in Böblingen, it is operated by the United States' DODEA (formerly known as DoDDS).

Opened in 2014, its enrollment is primarily dependents of military, civilian, and contract employees of the U.S. Department of Defense (DOD) who are assigned to units of the Stuttgart Military Community, which includes Patch Barracks, Robinson Barracks, Panzer Kaserne, and Kelley Barracks.

It succeeded Patch American High School (1979–2015, on Patch Barracks), and SHS remains the only DoDEA high school in the Stuttgart area. Patch's school history, panther mascot, and colors were carried over to Stuttgart; black and gold are also the colors of host state Baden-Württemberg.

Another predecessor, Stuttgart American High School (SAHS), began in 1954 at Robinson Barracks, relocated to Pattonville two years later, and closed in 1993.

== Academics ==
The school offers the same classes typical of a high school in the United States.

Courses are offered in a variety of fields:

- English (AP English Language, AP English Literature, and Honors courses are also offered)
- Mathematics (Algebra I, Geometry, Algebra II, AP Statistics, Pre-Calculus, AP Calculus, and others)
- Science (Physics, Chemistry, Anatomy, Biology, etc.)
- Foreign Languages (German, Spanish)
- Career and Technical (Computer programming, web design, accounting, finance, etc., including AP Computer Science)
- Fine Arts (humanities, art, band (advanced, intermediate, beginning), chorus, show choir, jazz band, string ensemble)
- Social Studies (Government, U.S. History, AP U.S. History, AP U.S. Government, AP World History, AP Human Geography, etc.)
- Army JROTC (8th Battalion)
- 25 AP class offerings

== Administration ==
The current principal is Seth Stillman.

== Sports ==
Stuttgart High School has a large variety of sports including:

- American football
- Baseball
- Basketball
- Cheerleading
- Cross country
- Golf
- Soccer
- Softball
- Swimming
- Tennis
- Track
- Volleyball
- Wrestling
- Drill team (JROTC students only)
- Rifle team (JROTC students only)

Including its time as Patch, the Panthers have previously won European Championships within DoDEA including rifle, drill, baseball, basketball, cheerleading, cross country, football, soccer, softball, tennis, volleyball, and wrestling. The rifle team is currently second in all of Army JROTC and is home to the second place individual marksman in all of Army JROTC.
