= Alexander M. Patch American High School =

(Alexander M.) Patch American High School (PAHS)

Location
- Stuttgart, Baden-Württemberg; Germany
- Coordinates: 48°44′07″N 9°04′31″E

Information
- School type: Department of Defense Dependents Schools
- Established: 1979
- Status: Closed
- Closed: 2015
- Grades: 9–12 (also 7–8 from 1979–2006)
- Colors: Black and gold
- Mascot: Panther
- Rivals: Stuttgart American (until 1992)

Alexander M. Patch American High School (also known as "Patch American High School" or "Patch High School") was an English language high school in Germany, on Patch Barracks southwest of Stuttgart, operated by DODEA (formerly known as DoDDS). Opened in 1979, its students were largely military dependents whose sponsors were assigned to units of the Stuttgart Military Community, including Patch Barracks, Robinson Barracks, Panzer Kaserne, and Kelley Barracks.

The school was named after United States Army General Alexander McCarrell Patch (1889–1945), the commander of the Seventh Army during World War II.

For its first 27 years, it was a secondary school (grades 7–12), and with the 1992 closure of Stuttgart American High School in Pattonville, it became the only DODEA (DoDDS) high school in the Stuttgart area. In the fall of 2006, the school's enrollment was reduced to a four-year high school (grades 9–12) due to projected increasing enrollment and middle schools created at nearby Panzer Kaserne and Robinson Barracks.

Following its 36th year of service, PAHS closed in 2015, officially on 30 June. The new Stuttgart High School on Panzer Kaserne, just east of Böblingen, opened that fall and remains the only DoDEA (DoDDS) high school in the Stuttgart area.

== Academics ==
The school offered the same typical classes as schools in the United States.

Some of the offered courses were as follows

- English (AP and Honors courses are also offered)
- Mathematics (Algebra through AP Calculus)
- Science (Physics, chemistry, anatomy, biology, etc.)
- Foreign Languages (German, French, Spanish)
- Computer courses
- Fine Arts (humanities, art, band (advanced, intermediate, beginning), chorus, show choir, jazz band, string ensemble, harmony express)
- History (Government, U.S. History, AP World History, AP Human Geography, AP U.S. History etc.)
- Business
- Army JROTC (8th Battalion)

== Sports ==
Patch AHS had a large variety of sports including tennis, swimming, cheerleading, volleyball, football, cross-country, track, golf, soccer, baseball, wrestling and for JROTC there was drill and rifle. Many of the teams won Europeans, including rifle, drill, cross-country, and wrestling. The rifle team was second in all of Army JROTC and was home to the second place individual marksman in all of Army JROTC, Leah Lynch.
