= Robinson Barracks =

U.S. military installation in Stuttgart, Germany

Coordinates: 48°49′17″N 9°11′16″E

Robinson Barracks is a military base of U.S. in the Burgholzhof community in the northern Stuttgart district of Bad Cannstatt. Unlike Patch Barracks and Kelley Barracks, also located in Stuttgart, the modern Robinson Barracks is now largely a residential neighborhood for US Department of Defense personnel stationed in the greater Stuttgart area operated and administered by IMCOM-Europe. The installation is named after 1st Lt. James E. Robinson, Jr. (1918–1945), an Army officer posthumously awarded the Medal of Honor during World War II.

== History ==
The military use of the site began in 1927 with the construction of a training ground named Flandern for the German Army's 119th Infantry Regiment. In 1934, an adjacent farm was impounded and barracks were constructed which later became the adjacent Grenadier Kaserne (now closed). After World War II the U.S. Army used the installation as a displaced persons camp until 1949 when the installation became an Army post renamed Robinson Barracks. From that time through the end of the Cold War, Robinson Barracks and Grenadier Kaserne operated largely as a housing area, shopping area and logistical support activity for the Stuttgart Military Community, which covered 13 installations over an area the size of Rhode Island and over 32,000 soldiers and civilian staff. The former Wallace Barracks, now the Römerkastell development, lies just downhill from Robinson Barracks and was used by the main Stuttgart PX for storage. During the 1950s, the US Army built most of the housing and other facilities used during the Cold War era, including the largest PX in Europe.

After the fall of the Berlin Wall, the United States began to draw down the force structure in Europe, including the 1992 deactivation of VII Corps (United States), headquartered in Stuttgart at Kelley Barracks and responsible for almost all activities in Stuttgart excepting EUCOM at Patch Barracks. In 1993, the United States Army returned the portion of the installation that formerly hosted Europe's largest PX to the German government, which was redeveloped from 1996 to 2006 as a highly energy efficient neighborhood called Burgholzhof that is now home to about 3,000 people. With the ongoing realignment of the US forces in Europe there has been an increased demand for housing in Stuttgart and the Army is currently engaged in a renovation project of the facilities on Robinson Barracks. Due to ongoing security concerns for force protection, the US Army has installed a perimeter fence around the formerly open installation.

Under current plans, Robinson Barracks will continue to operate by providing housing and support to the enduring-designated Stuttgart Military Community, centered on the 2 US Unified Commands headquartered in Stuttgart—EUCOM and AFRICOM.

== Education ==
From 1953 to 1955 Stuttgart American High School was operated at Robinson Barracks until being moved to nearby Pattonville—a now-closed US housing area where it operated until 1992 with the drawdown of US forces in Germany and disbanding of VII Corps (United States). Currently, students from Robinson Barracks attend Stuttgart American High School located on Panzer Kaserne. DODEA operates an Elementary School at the installation.

== AFN Stuttgart ==
During the Cold War the US operated a significant network of AFN radio and television broadcast stations throughout Germany, and the Stuttgart community was served by a regional network based at Robinson Barracks from 1959 to 1993. With the withdrawal of US forces from Mannheim and Heidelberg, the AFN operations based there are being relocated to Robinson Barracks in 2013 after an interim period at Patch Barracks while permanent facilities are prepared.

== Burgholzhof Observation Tower ==
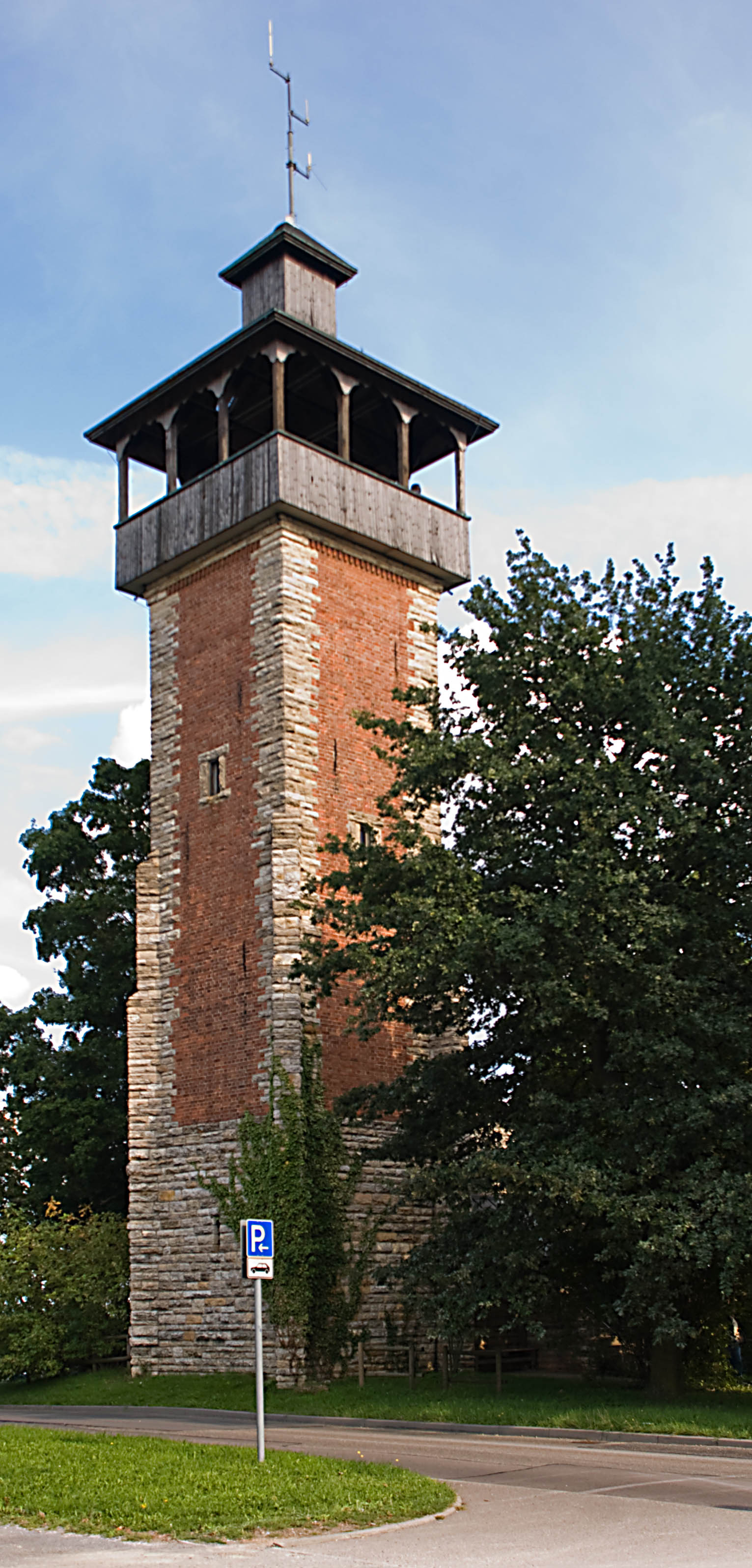
The Observation Tower Burgholzhof

The Observation Tower Burgholzhof is a well-known landmark, built in 1891, that was just outside the installation prior to its reduction in size. During World War II the tower was used by anti-aircraft spotter personnel keeping a look-out for Allied bomber attacks (more information here). With the redevelopment of the Stuttgart PX site as the Burgholzhof, the tower has become a symbol of the neighborhood. The tower is open free to the public May–October, 10:00–18:00, on weekends only.

== See also ==
- Grenadier Kaserne
- Kelley Barracks
- Nellingen Kaserne
- Panzer Kaserne
- Patch Barracks
- Pattonville
- United States Army Europe
- Wallace Barracks
