= Herman Wallace =

Herman Wallace may refer to:

- Herman C. Wallace (1924–1945), American soldier in World War II posthumously awarded the Medal of Honor
- Herman Wallace, American prisoner known as one of the Angola 3; incarcerated for 41 years (1972–2013) in solitary confinement

== See also ==
- Wallace (surname)
