= Stuttgart American High School =

Secondary school in Germany

Coordinates: 48.875°N 9.221°E

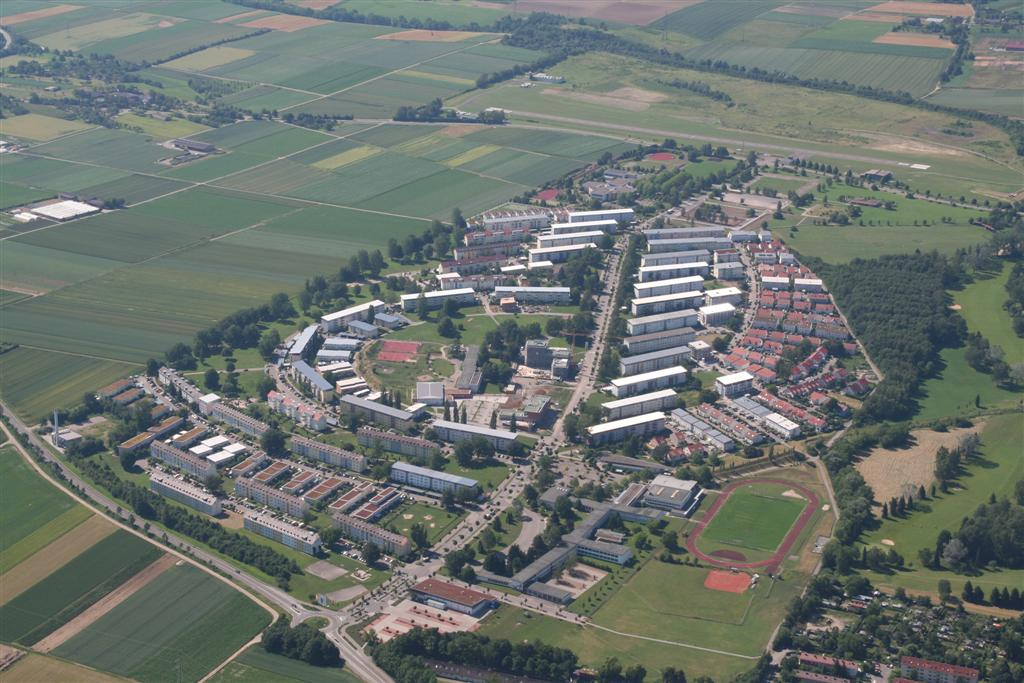
- Pattonville from the north, circa 2006, with former SAHS campus in foreground, adjacent to the golf course

Information
- Former name: Ludwigsburg American High School (1961-1968)
- Established: 1953
- Closed: 2015
- Enrollment: c.1200

Stuttgart American High School in West Germany was first located at Robinson Barracks (old SA (SturmAbteilung) barracks), north of Stuttgart, from fall 1953 to spring 1955. That fall, the school moved a few miles northeast and opened at Pattonville, a new U.S. military housing complex just southeast of Ludwigsburg, with 300 students and 35 graduating seniors. For school years 1956/57/58, it was a secondary school (grades 7–12).

With its campus at the northwest corner of Pattonville, the school was also known as Ludwigsburg American High School from 1961 to 1968, with 1,200 students and 280 graduating seniors. Between 1970 and 1973, Stuttgart American High School was under the Trump Plan.

Location in Germany

At Patch Barracks, southwest of Stuttgart, Patch American High School opened in the fall of 1979 with 900 students; in June 1992, SAHS closed with 300 students and 52 graduating seniors. Several families had been transferred to Fort Huachuca, Arizona, and remaining students transferred to Patch. In the summer of 2001, the former SAHS site became Erich-Bracher-Schule.

Patch American High School closed in 2015, and the new Stuttgart High School opened that fall on Panzer Kaserne, just east of Böblingen, as the sole DODEA high school in the Stuttgart Military Community.

== Notable students and graduates ==
- Newt Gingrich (former U.S. Speaker of the House, presidential candidate; attended in late 1950s
- Daniel Hesse (former Chief Executive Officer, Sprint Corporation); graduated c.1971
- Katrina Leskanich (Katrina and the Waves) Grammy nominee, actress, TV and radio presenter); attended in mid-1970s
