= Observation Tower Burgholzhof =

Coordinates: 48°49′08″N 9°11′41″E

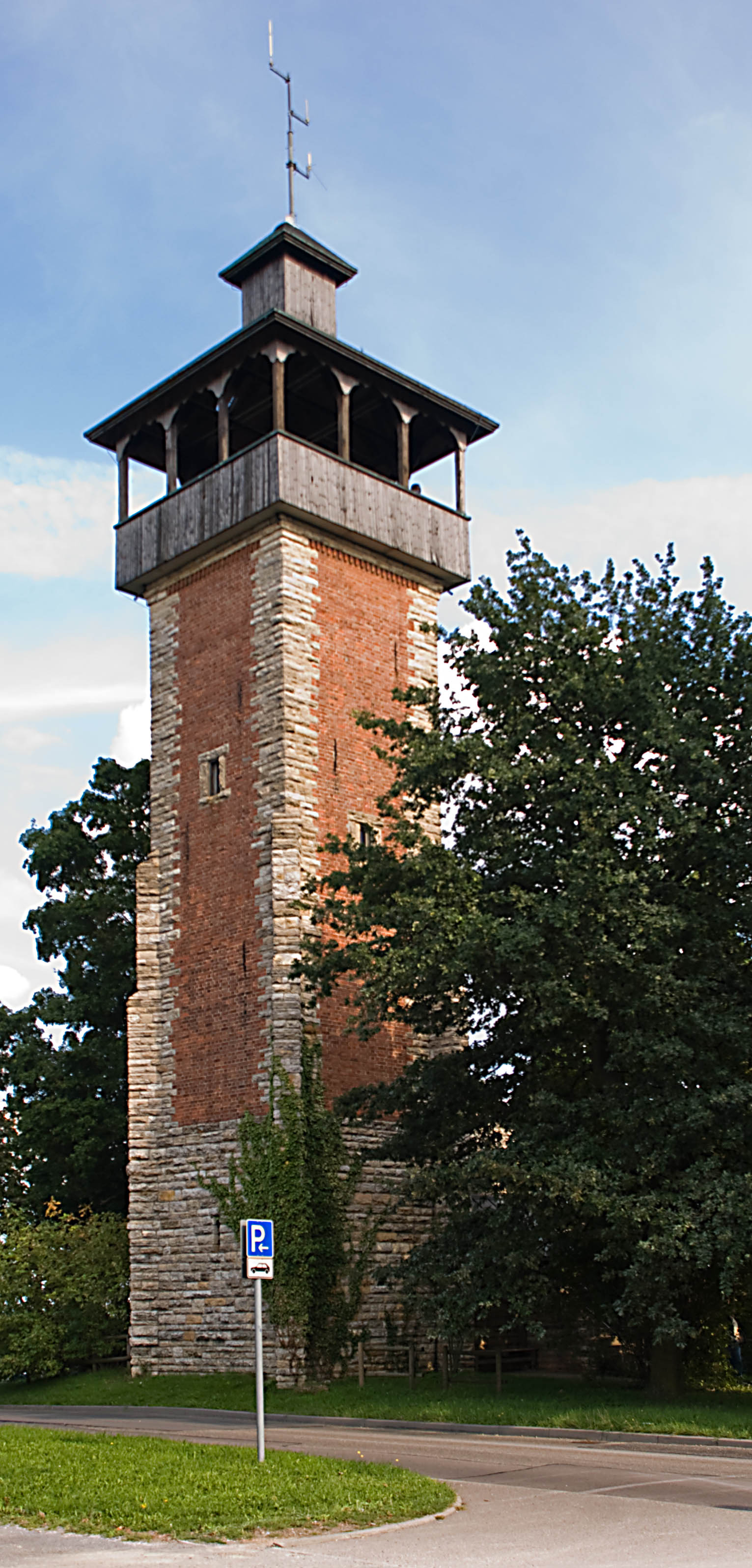

The Observation Tower Burgholzhof in Burgholzhof, since 1998 a separate community within Bad Cannstatt in Stuttgart, Baden-Württemberg, Germany, is an 1891 brick observation tower constructed by the Cannstatt municipal architect Friedrich Keppler on behalf of the Verschönerungsverein Cannstatt e. V. ("Society for the Beautification of Cannstatt"), in the style of a Roman tower, at an elevation of 359 meters (1778 ft) above sea level, at 9°11'41 east and 48°49'08" north. It was formally opened on 19 September 1891. It has extensive views over East Stuttgart, Bad Cannstatt and along the Neckar valley as far as Esslingen am Neckar.

During World War II the tower was used by anti-aircraft spotter personnel keeping a look-out for Allied bomber attacks.

Burgholzhof observation tower was restored in 1987/88, on the initiative of the local amenity group Pro Alt-Cannstatt, and since then has again been accessible during the summer (May - October, 10:00 - 18:00, on weekends only, admission is free).

Nearby, to the north of the tower, is a point-to-point radio tower used for military purposes, at 48°49'11 north.

The tower, in an anthropomorphic form known as "Burgi", is the mascot of the new community of Burgholzhof- constructed on land returned by the US Army from adjacent Robinson Barracks after closure of the Stuttgart main PX.

== Sources and external links ==
- Stuttgart Burgholzhof website (in German)
- Photos
