= Pattonville =

Neighborhood in Baden-Württemberg, Germany

Coordinates: 48°52′24″N 9°13′27″E

Location in Germany

Pattonville is a neighborhood in Baden-Württemberg, Germany, northeast of Stuttgart, with the unusual distinction of being a former United States military housing complex, as few U.S. installations returned to German control have been maintained in their former form.

== History ==
=== Housing Complex of the U.S. Military ===
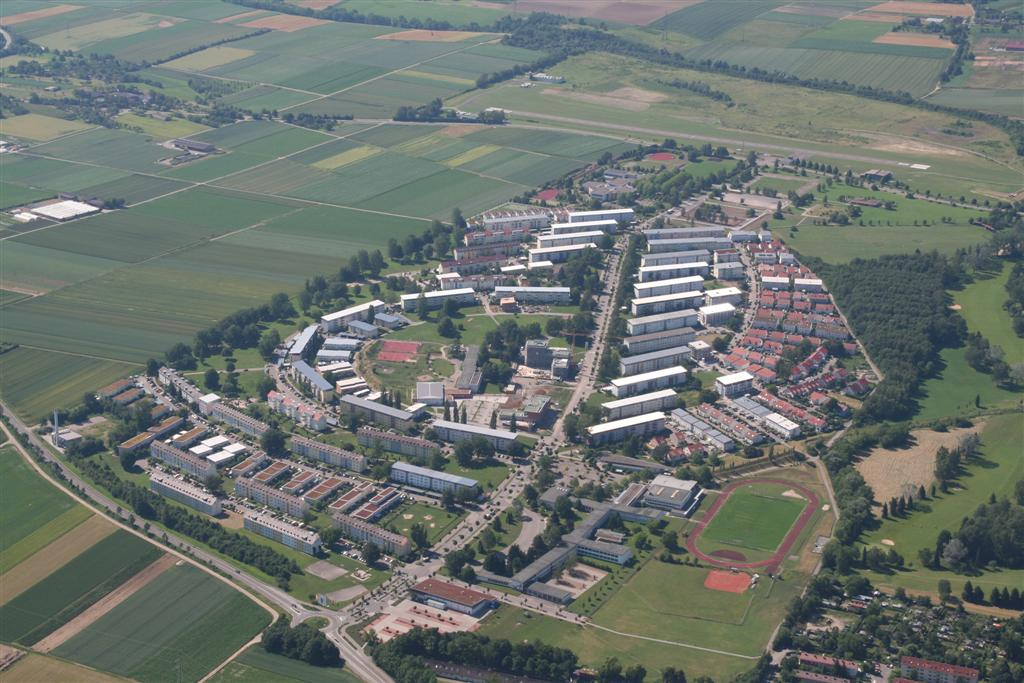
Pattonville from the north, c. 2006, with Golf Club Neckar eV to the right

Pattonville was a large U.S. military housing installation in West Germany during the Cold War, built and maintained by the U.S. Army from 1955 to 1992 as part of the Stuttgart Military Community. It was built on a former parade ground near Ludwigsburg in the area of the municipality of Aldingen. The community was named for General George S. Patton (1885–1945), commander of the Third Army in World War II.

Located northeast of Stuttgart and just southeast of Ludwigsburg, Pattonville was home to Stuttgart American High School from 1955 to 1992, with a peak enrollment of 1,200 during the 1960s. Former Speaker of the House Newt Gingrich and musician Katrina Leskanich of Katrina and the Waves are among the better known students of SAHS, although both graduated elsewhere. Patch American High School at Patch Barracks, southwest of Stuttgart, became the only DODEA (DoDDS) High School for the vicinity in 1992; it closed in 2015, and the new Stuttgart High School opened that fall on Panzer Kaserne, just east of Böblingen, as the sole DODEA highschool in the Stuttgart Military Community.

=== Closure and Redevelopment ===
Following the withdrawal of most Army units in the area after the Gulf War, the installation was returned to the German government. Since 1992, jurisdiction of the area had been shared by the cities of Kornwestheim and Remseck am Neckar as successor of the municipality of Aldingen. The irregular boundary between the two cities was realigned along John-F.-Kennedy-Allee, Pattonville's central spine, so that the western half now belongs to Kornwestheim and the larger, eastern half to Remseck.

Largely a housing complex, Pattonville was opened in 1994 as apartments for the local German population, and the former Stuttgart American School complex is now in use as the Erich-Bracher-Schule.

Pattonville's current population of approximately 6,000 (2013) is split between the two cities. The streets, named after various U.S. states, are a reminder of the postwar American military presence.

== Pattonville Airfield ==
The former military airfield south of the settlement is now used by civilian aviation clubs and additionally supports the rescue helicopter "Christoph 51" of the DRF Luftrettung. The helicopter was relocated to Pattonville airfield due to air traffic congestion at Stuttgart Airport. It has become a recreational aerodrome, with the German civilian ICAO code EDTQ.

== Stuttgart Golf Club ==
A noted feature of Pattonville was the Stuttgart Golf Club, a 7,000-yard (6,400 m) 18-hole golf course and club on 300 acres (120 ha), operated by and for the U.S. military and their families. Designed by Bernhard von Limburger, it opened in 1956, adjacent to the west, and West German locals were first allowed access in 1969.

Over time, the club allowed a limited number of German members and the club was transitioned to shared German control with the large withdrawal of U.S. Army personnel from Stuttgart and Ludwigsburg following the Gulf War; it is now known as Golf Club Neckar eV. The American Stuttgart Golf Club is operated by the U.S. Army Garrison Stuttgart Family and Morale, Welfare and Recreation Office. The golf course and club are the only remaining link to the former U.S. installation.
