= Nellingen Kaserne =

Former US military airfield near Stuttgart

Coordinates: 48.71775°N 9.27053°E

Nellingen Kaserne was a U.S. Army airfield and barracks near Stuttgart in the town of Ostfildern in Germany.

== History ==
The site was selected in the 1930s as the site for a new airport for Stuttgart but was instead developed as a military airfield named Fliegerhorst Nellingen in 1938.

Following World War II the U.S. used Nellingen to host various units until after the Cold War and Gulf War. The Theater Military Police School that trained US Constabulary soldiers during the occupation of Germany was located at Nellingen.

Most of the units stationed at Nellingen from the 1950s onward were assigned to the VII Corps (US) headquartered nearby at Kelley Barracks, also serving as an Army Medical Helicopter airfield, and was part of the Stuttgart Military Community. The 2nd Support Command was deployed from Nellingen to the Gulf along with VII Corps for Operation Desert Shield and Desert Storm.

== Redevelopment ==
Nellingen Kaserne was closed as part of the US Forces drawdown after German Reunification and the Gulf War. In 1992 the installation was closed and the property was returned to the German government, which partially razed and redeveloped the site.

Of particular note was the environmental design used in the redevelopment, begun in 1996. The redevelopment plan included reuse of building materials from the former Nellingen Kaserne, energy and water efficient buildings and an extension of a light rail line to the new community. The result is Scharnhauser Park, which now contains over 3500 housing units and hosts a population of over 6000. Additionally, a new town hall within the development was given a special mention in the European Union Prize for Contemporary Architecture/Mies van der Rohe Awards for 2003. The total cost of redevelopment has exceeded €1.5 billion.

Very little of the former US installation remains, but a few of the pre World War II buildings from the Luftwaffe have been remodeled and retained.

== See also ==
- VII Corps (United States)
- United States Army Europe
- Ostfildern
