= United States European Command =

U.S. military unified combatant command

- Emblem of the United States European Command
- Founded: 1 August 1952
- Country: United States
- Type: Unified combatant command
- Role: Geographic combatant command
- Size: 85,500
- Part of: Department of Defense
- Headquarters: Patch Barracks, Stuttgart, Germany
- Nickname: EUCOM
- Website: Official website

Commanders
- Commander: Gen Alexus G. Grynkewich, USAF
- Deputy Commander: LtGen Robert C. Fulford, USMC
- Command Senior Enlisted Leader: CSM Thomas J. Holland, USA

Insignia
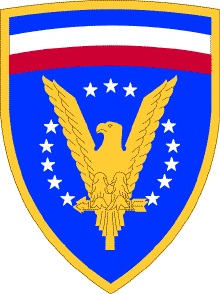
- Shoulder Sleeve Insignia

- NATO Map Symbol

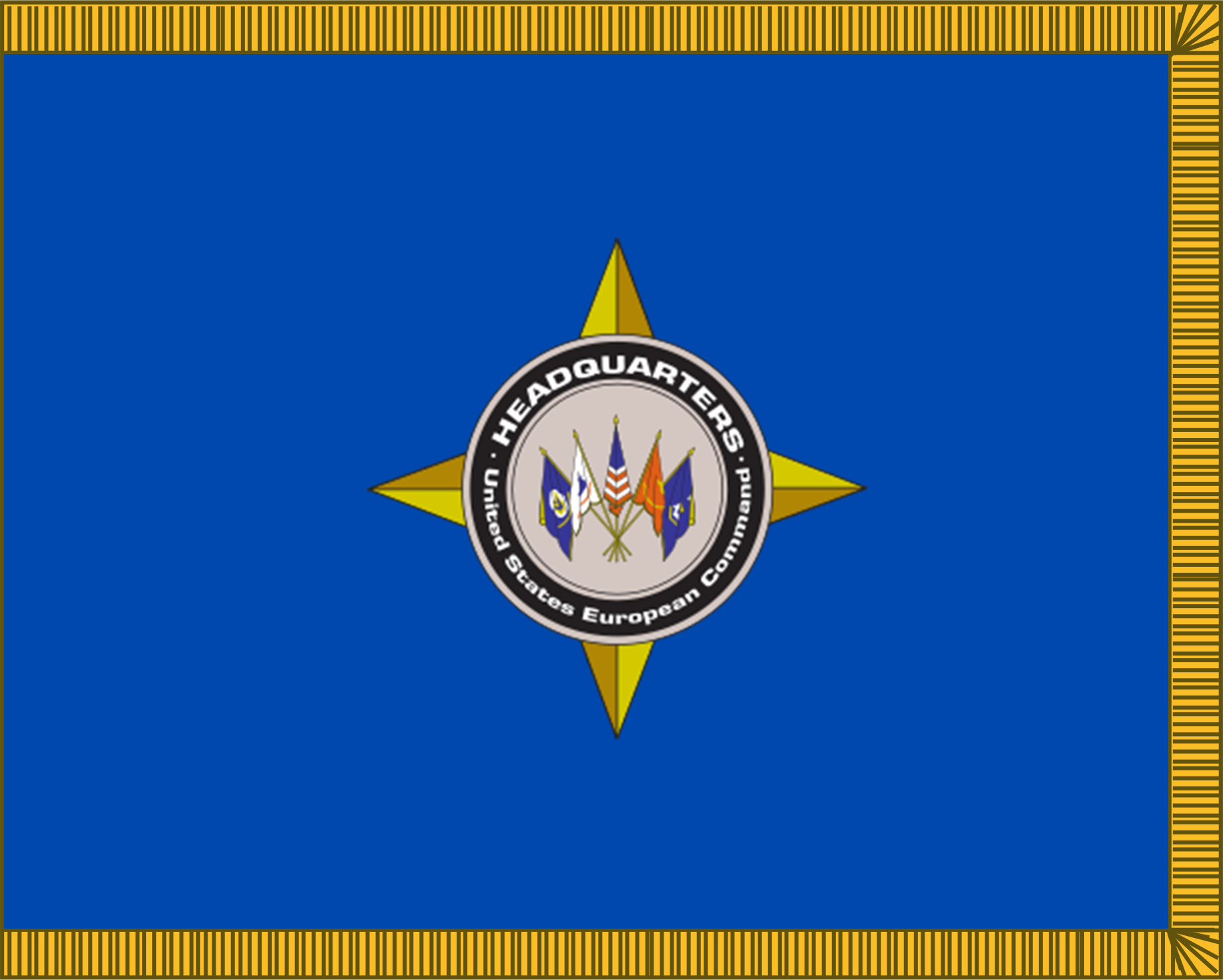
- US European Command Headquarters Flag

The United States European Command (EUCOM) is one of the eleven unified combatant commands of the United States military, headquartered in Stuttgart, Germany. Its area of focus covers 21,000,000 square miles (54,000,000 km^{2}) and 51 countries and territories, including Europe, the Caucasus, and Russia. The Commander of the United States EUCOM simultaneously serves as the Supreme Allied Commander, Europe (SACEUR) within NATO, a military alliance. During the Gulf War and Operation Northern Watch, EUCOM controlled the forces flying from Incirlik Air Base.

== History and significant operations ==
Prior to 1952, the title "European Command (EUCOM)" referred to a single-service, United States Army command. The senior U.S. Army administrative command in the European region had previously been designated European Theater of Operations United States Army (ETOUSA) from 8 June 1942 – 1 July 1945; United States Forces European Theater (USFET) from 1 July 1945 – 15 March 1947; and then European Command (EUCOM) 15 March 1947 – 1 August 1952.

=== 1950s ===
The first unified command in the European area was established by the Joint Chiefs of Staff on 1 August 1952. Designated the U.S. European Command (USEUCOM), it was established to provide "unified command and authority" over all U.S. forces in Europe. Prior to 1 August 1952, the U.S. Air Force, U.S. Navy, and U.S. Army presence in Europe maintained separate commands that reported directly to the Joint Chiefs of Staff.

The respective titles of the service commands were: Commander-in-Chief, U.S. Air Forces in Europe (USAFE); Commander-in-Chief, U.S. Naval Forces, Eastern Atlantic and Mediterranean; and Commander-in-Chief, U.S. European Command. In line with the creation of the joint-service European Command, the Army command in Europe has redesignated U.S. Army Europe on 1 August 1952.

The unified command structure was born of the need to address changes wrought not only by America's rapid post-war demobilization but the end of the occupation of Germany in 1949. Questions arose over the U.S. commitment to the defense of Western Europe against the Soviet Union (USSR). Providing for the common defense was a great concern, especially after the Berlin Crisis of 1948–49 when the Soviet Union blocked access to the divided city and the U.S. and United Kingdom responded with an unprecedented airlift. In 1949 the allies established the North Atlantic Treaty Organization (NATO).

In 1952 the area of responsibility included continental Europe, the United Kingdom, North Africa and Turkey. The AOR was subsequently expanded to include Southwest Asia as far east as Iran and as far south as Saudi Arabia.

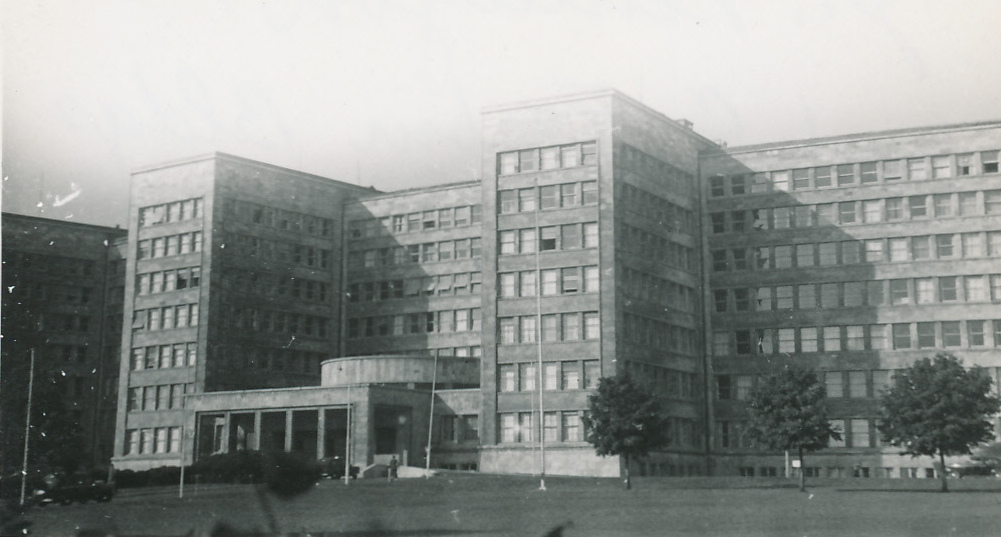
The EUCOM headquarters in the IG Farben Building, Frankfurt, 1952

After the Korean War began, the perceived threat to Europe grew. In early 1951, NATO established Allied Command Europe. General Dwight D. Eisenhower was called from retirement to become the first Supreme Allied Commander Europe. The United States sent massive reinforcements to Europe to deter the Soviet Union.

From 1950 to 1953 United States military personnel in Europe grew from 120,000 to over 400,000. United States Air Forces in Europe grew from three groups with 35,000 personnel to eleven wings with 136,000 personnel. Sixth Fleet in the Mediterranean doubled to more than 40 warships. United States Army, Europe, grew from one infantry division and three constabulary regiments to two corps with five divisions (including two mobilized National Guard divisions) and in November 1950 activated a new field army, Seventh Army, at Patch Barracks, Stuttgart.

The Army activated the 10th Special Forces Group at Fort Bragg in 1952 and deployed it to Bad Tölz in November 1953 for unconventional warfare missions in the Soviet Bloc countries. To provide for national command within NATO and to help control this build-up of forces, Gen. Eisenhower proposed a separate command for all United States forces in Europe. Because the senior United States commander would continue as Supreme Allied Commander Europe, Eisenhower recommended giving "a maximum of delegated authority" to a four-star deputy.

Eisenhower returned to the United States just as the new command was established. The first United States Commander-in-Chief Europe (USCINCEUR) was General Matthew Ridgway, former commander of Eighth Army and the Far East Command during the Korean War. His deputy was General Thomas T. Handy, commander of United States Army, Europe. At this point the position of USCINCEUR was "dual hatted" with Supreme Allied Commander Europe (SACEUR).

Headquarters EUCOM initially shared the I.G. Farben Building in Frankfurt, Germany, with Headquarters United States Army, Europe. By 1953 over 400,000 U.S. troops were stationed in Europe. In 1954, the headquarters moved to Camp des Loges, a French Army base west of Paris and a short distance from SHAPE. There, EUCOM prepared plans for the defense of Western Europe within the NATO framework against the Soviet Union and Warsaw Pact.

EUCOM used the Military Assistance Program to help its NATO partners build their military capabilities, including after 1955 the German Bundeswehr. In 1955, EUCOM established a Support Operations Command Europe, soon renamed Support Operations Task Force Europe (later Special Operations Command Europe) for special operations missions. In 1961, EUCOM began operating an airborne command post, Operation Silk Purse.

=== 1960s ===
During the 1961 Berlin Crisis, on 25 August 1961, the Department of Defense announced 148,000 reserve personnel would be called on 1 October for twelve months of active duty service. 27,000 of these would be from Air Force Reserve and Air National Guard flying squadrons and support units to augment the Air Force, and 112,000 were U.S. Army Reserve. Many Army Reservists were sent to Europe to bring ground combat units up to full strength.

Civil war broke out in Lebanon in 1958 due to mounting religious and political conflicts (see "1958 Lebanon crisis"). EUCOM conducted a major contingency operation, Operation Blue Bat, in response to Lebanon's request to restore stability within the government.

In 1966, following disagreements by the French with certain NATO military policies, President Charles de Gaulle stated that all forces within France's borders would have to come under French control by April 1969. Soon afterward, France announced that SHAPE and its subordinate headquarters must leave French territory by April 1967. The following year, SHAPE moved to Mons, Belgium, while Headquarters EUCOM moved to Patch Barracks in Stuttgart, Germany. Headquarters Seventh Army moved to Heidelberg, where it merged with Headquarters United States Army, Europe. At Patch Barracks, EUCOM renovated the buildings, built a new operations center, and modernized communications infrastructure.

EUCOM continued to prepare for the defense of Europe and began a series of annual REFORGER (Return of Forces to Germany) exercises in 1967. Cold War crises continued, including the 1968 Warsaw Pact invasion of Czechoslovakia. But, because of the Vietnam War, the number of the American forces in Europe slowly declined. Troop strength in Europe fell to 265,000 by 1970.

=== 1970s ===
During the 1970s, force protection concerns in Europe increased as terrorist groups, such as the Red Army Faction and the Red Brigades, targeted American facilities and personnel with bombings, kidnappings, and assassinations. Palestinian terrorist organizations conducted terror operations in Europe, such as the kidnapping of Israeli athletes during the 1972 Summer Olympics in Munich.

EUCOM and its components continued to provide military assistance throughout Europe, as well as humanitarian assistance, disaster relief, noncombatant evacuation, support to peacekeeping operations, and other non-traditional missions in Europe, Africa, and the Middle East. For example, after the Congo became independent in 1960, EUCOM joined in several multinational operations in that country, including peacekeeping, humanitarian assistance, and noncombatant evacuation in 1960, November 1964 (Operation Dragon Rouge), the 1967 second Stanleyville mutiny and again in 1978 (during Shaba II). In the Middle East, EUCOM provided military assistance to Israel and noncombatant evacuation of American citizens in 1967, 1973, and 1982–1984.

In the late 1970s, the Soviet Union deployed SS-20 intermediate-range ballistic missiles into Eastern Europe and, in 1979, invaded Afghanistan. NATO responded with a "two-track" decision to step up negotiations while deploying American intermediate-range Pershing II missiles and Ground Launched Cruise Missiles (GLCM) to counter Soviet actions.

=== 1980s ===
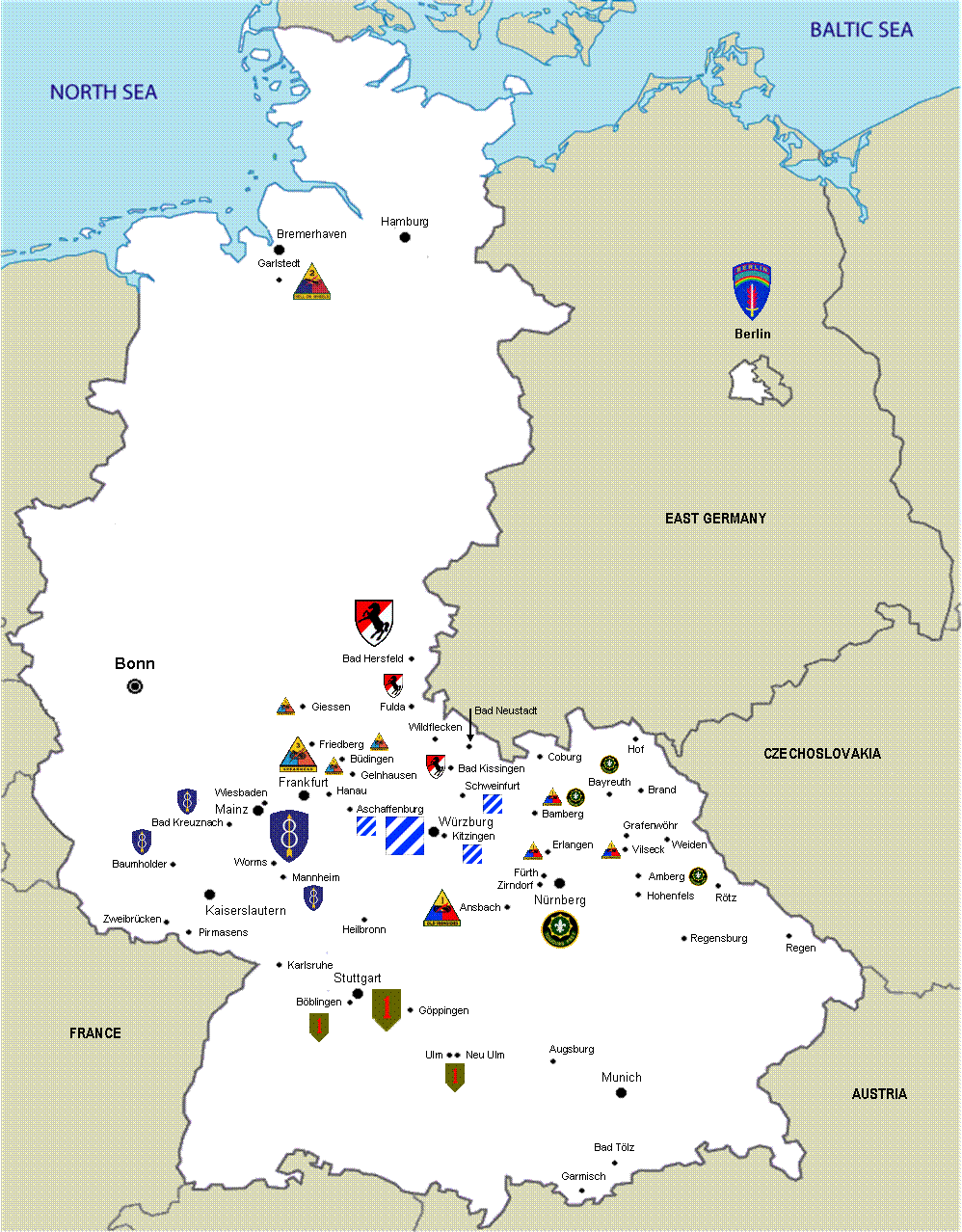
US Army units in West Germany, 1987

During the 1980s, American forces in Europe increased to over 350,000. EUCOM established Fleet Marine Force Europe (later MARFOREUR) in 1980.

The 1983 Unified Command Plan transferred responsibility for the Middle East from EUCOM to a new combatant command, U.S. Central Command (CENTCOM), but EUCOM retained responsibility for Israel, Lebanon and Syria. At the same time, EUCOM was formally assigned responsibility for Africa south of the Sahara. Thus the area of responsibility became Europe (including the United Kingdom and Ireland), the Mediterranean Sea (including the islands), and the Mediterranean littoral (excluding Egypt, Sudan, Kenya, Ethiopia, Somalia and Djibouti).

The Goldwater-Nichols Act of 1986, together with Chairman of the Joint Chiefs of Staff, Gen. Colin L. Powell, who served from 1989 to 1993, further strengthened the role of combatant commanders. Goldwater-Nichols also established United States Special Operations Command, which led to the activation of a new sub-unified command, Special Operations Command, Europe.

During the 1980s, negotiations continued with the Soviet Union on strategic and theater-level arms limitation. In 1987, the Intermediate-Range Nuclear Forces Treaty (INF Treaty) called an end to the deployment of SS-20s, Pershing IIs and GLCMs. In 1990, NATO and Warsaw Pact members signed a treaty on conventional armed forces in Europe (CFE).

In 1989, the Soviet Union and other Soviet Bloc countries in Eastern Europe collapsed and the Cold War came to an end. The citizens from both East and West Berlin began tearing down the Berlin Wall on 9 November 1989.

=== 1990s ===
As a sign of reduced tensions, in 1991 EUCOM took its airborne command post off alert. Meanwhile, in 1991, EUCOM and its components provided forces -primarily VII Corps- to CENTCOM for Operation Desert Storm.

EUCOM supports programs in former Soviet Bloc countries such as the Joint Contract Team Program, NATO Partnership for Peace and the National Guard Bureau State Partnership Program. It was also active in operations in the Balkans, including Bosnia, Macedonia and Kosovo. During this time, EUCOM's assigned forces were lowered below 120,000.

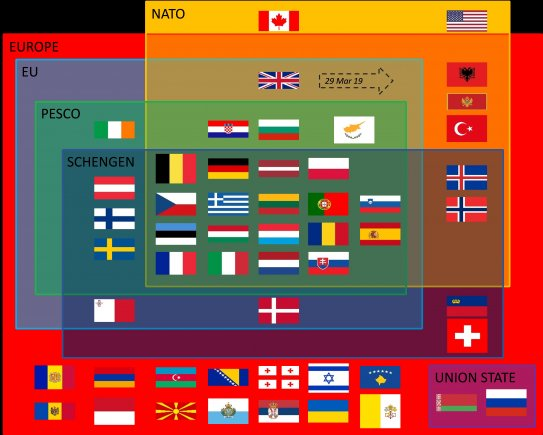
An Euler diagram of European alliances, partners, and competitors, denoted by their national flags, in EUCOM's Area of Responsibility. The alliances and agreements include the following supranational bodies: PESCO, Schengen Area, EU, and NATO.

Since 1990, EUCOM has hosted or co-hosted the annual International Military Chiefs of Chaplains Conference, the only one of its kind in the world, working to foster cooperation among religious leaders and understanding of religion as both a force for war and a force for peace.

In 1999, changes to the command's area of responsibility were announced, after amendments to the Unified Command Plan. The United States Atlantic Command areas that had included the waters off Europe and the west coast of Africa were to be transferred to European Command. U.S. European Command already had responsibility for all U.S. land and air military planning in Europe and most of Africa. The change gave EUCOM the responsibility for maritime planning in the same general area of operations.

=== 2000s ===
The changes were made effective on 1 October 2000. The Atlantic Command areas that presently include the waters off Europe and the west coast of Africa were also transferred to European Command.

Immediately after the terrorist attacks against New York and Washington, D.C., on 11 September 2001, NATO invoked Article V of the treaty and deployed NATO early warning aircraft to help monitor the skies over North America. EUCOM provided major forces for subsequent operations in Afghanistan and stepped up its efforts to protect United States interests in Europe and Africa. Subsequent terrorist attacks in the EUCOM theater in Casablanca, Madrid, London and Algiers prompted EUCOM to launch Operation Enduring Freedom Trans-Sahara in 2007 while continuing to provide rotational forces to Afghanistan and Iraq.

The 2002 Unified Command Plan transferred responsibility for Lebanon and Syria to CENTCOM, but EUCOM retained responsibility for Israel, and assumed responsibility for Russia (formerly held by the Joint Staff) and for an increased portion of the North Atlantic, to include Iceland and the Portuguese Azores (formerly held by the U.S. Joint Forces Command). The Iceland Defense Force formed part of EUCOM from 2002 until 2006 when it was disestablished.

Joint Task Force East provided from forces rotating from the continental United States through bases in Bulgaria and Romania, was initially intended to be provided by a rotating US-based brigade. Two bases at Constanţa, Romania was developed, apparently with the main facility at Mihail Kogălniceanu Airfield. Initially, however, Joint Task Force East was to have been provided by a rotational 2nd Cavalry Regiment Stryker squadron. The Task Force was originally planned to be called the Eastern Europe Task Force. However, since the stresses of the Iraq and Afghan deployments, the army provision of the Joint Task Force East has been replaced by a Marine force known as the Black Sea Rotational Force.

In 2003, the headquarters reorganized to establish the EUCOM Plans and Operations Center (EPOC). From 2006 to 2008, EUCOM helped stand-up a new geographic unified combatant command, United States Africa Command (AFRICOM), which moved to nearby Kelley Barracks and took over responsibility for Department of Defense activities in Africa on 1 October 2008.

=== 2020s ===
At the end of the first Trump presidency, 12,000 American troops were ordered out of Germany shifting to Belgium and Italy and returning to the United States. Secretary of Defense Mark Esper expected the plan to cost billions. The plan was never put into effect and was later canceled by President Biden.

On January 15, 2021, EUCOM transferred coordination of military activities for Israel to CENTCOM.

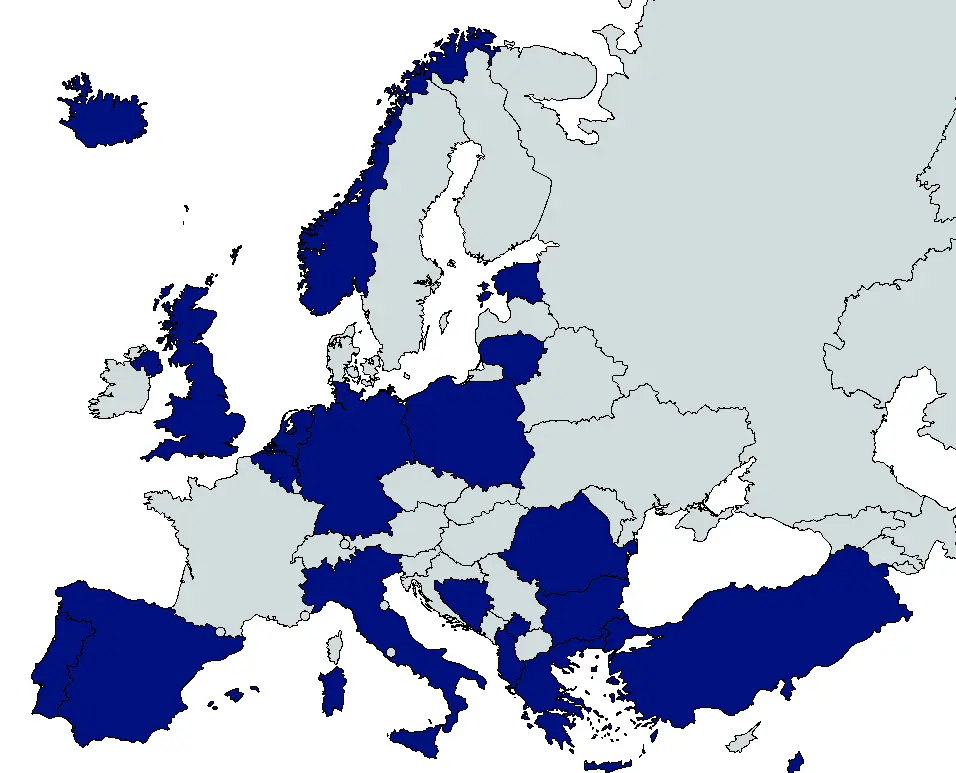
Map of Countries with United States military bases and facilities in Europe

In 2025, Ansa reported that President Trump wanted to reduce the troop presence in Europe by about 20,000 and wanted financial contributions from European countries for the remaining soldiers.

In June 2025, the area of responsibility of Greenland was shifted from EUCOM to USNORTHCOM.

== Timeline ==
1967: U.S. European Command headquarters moves to Patch Barracks, Stuttgart, Germany.
1970: 265,000 US troops stationed in Europe.
1980: 350,000 US troops stationed in Europe.
1983: U.S. Central Command is established and takes over responsibility for DoD activities in the Middle East from EUCOM.
1990: VII Corps (US Army) and other USAREUR units are deployed from EUCOM to Saudi Arabia for the Gulf War.
1992: VII Corps (US Army) after redeploying from Saudi Arabia and Kuwait is withdrawn from EUCOM and inactivated.
1999: US troops stationed in Europe fall below 120,000.
2002: V Corps (US Army) is deployed from EUCOM to Kuwait for the Iraq War.
2003: General James L. Jones becomes the first US Marine to be EUCOM Commander.
2006: V Corps (US Army) is deployed from EUCOM to Iraq as the command and control element for Multi-National Corps–Iraq.
2008: U.S. Africa Command is established and takes over responsibility for DoD activities in Africa from EUCOM.
2009: Navy Admiral James G. Stavridis becomes EUCOM's 15th Commander and the first Navy Admiral to lead the HQ.
2012: V Corps (US Army) is deployed from EUCOM to Afghanistan, providing command and control of all United States ground forces engaged in the theater.
2013: V Corps (US Army) is inactivated after redeploying from Afghanistan, leaving EUCOM without a Corps HQ for the first time since 1951.
2020: V Corps (US Army) is reactivated in Fort Knox. Corps forward headquarters is to be in Poznań, Poland.

=== Operations ===
The following list details all operations in which EUCOM has been involved since its inception.

1950s

- Lebanon Crisis 1958 – USEUCOM transported 2,000 troops and more than 4.5 million tons of equipment to Lebanon.

1960s

- Congo Crisis 1960 – USEUCOM transported UN troops and cargo to the Congo.
- Cyprus Crisis 1964 – USEUCOM positioned ships near the island to conduct evacuation of non-military personnel and deterrent operations if needed.
- Congo Crisis 1964 – USEUCOM transported Belgian paratroopers in a rescue operation in the Congo.
- Cyprus Crisis 1965 – Airlifted UN peacekeepers and equipment to Cyprus.
- Congo Crisis 1967 – Provided airlift support for supplies, Congolese troops, and refugees.

1970s

- Jordan Hostage Crisis 1970
- Operation Nickel Grass 1973 – Support of Israel in the Yom Kippur War.
- Operation Night Reach 1973 – Transported UN peacekeepers to Middle East at end of Yom Kippur War.
- Cyprus Crisis 1974
- Operation Nimrod Spar 1974/1975 – Cleared the Suez Canal.
- Airlift 1978 – Airlifted multinational forces to Zaire to counter invasion by Angola.

1980s

- Iranian Hostage Crisis 1981 – Release of 52 hostages held for 444 days.
- Hostage Crisis 1982 – Italy – Release of Brigadier General James L. Dozier.
- Operation Arid Farmer 1983 – Supported in the Crisis in Chad.
- Beirut Bombing 1983 – USEUCOM coordinated evacuation and treatment of wounded Marines and identified and returned to CONUS the remains of 241 Marines killed.
- Beirut Air Bridge 1984–1998 – Provided administrative and logistical support the US Embassy in Beirut.
- Operation Eldorado Canyon 1986 – USAF and USN air strikes on Libya in retaliation for terrorist bombing of La Belle Disco in West Berlin.

1990s

- Operation Steel Box/Golden Python 1990 – Supported withdrawal of chemical munitions from Germany and coordination of delivery/transport to Johnson Atoll.
- Hostage Situation 1990–1992 – Hostage release support for Americans kidnapped and held in the Middle East.
- Desert Storm and Proven Force 1991 – War to remove Iraq from Kuwait.
- Provide Comfort II 1991 – Kurdish security zone in northern Iraq.
- Operation Restore Hope 1992–1994 – Assisted in US Somali security efforts.
- Operation Deny Flight 1993–1995 – Support to UN/NATO enforcement of no-fly zone over Bosnia-Herzegovina.
- Operation Sharp Guard 1993–1996
- Operation Able Sentry/Sabre 1993–1999 – Task force attached to UN Preventive Deployment Force in Macedonia to monitor border activity.
- Operation Vigilant Warrior 1994 – Response to Iraqi buildup along Kuwait border.
- Operation United Shield 1995 – Support of US withdrawal from Somalia.
- Operation Quick Lift 1995 – Support of NATO Rapid Reaction Force and Croatia forces deployment to Bosnia-Herzegovina.
- Operation Nomad Vigil 1995 – deployment to Albania in support of Predator Unmanned Aerial Vehicle.
- Operation Deliberate Force 1995 – NATO air strikes on Bosnian Serb military forces.
- Operation Desert Strike 1996 – Missile Strikes on Iraq.
- Operation Northern Watch 1997–present – Enforcement of No Fly Zone over northern Iraq.
- Operation Assured Lift 1997 – In support of Liberian cease-fire monitoring.
- Operation High Flight 1997 – Search and Rescue effort at Windhoek, Namibia.
- Operations Phoenix Scorpion I & II 1997–1998 – support to UN weapons inspectors in Iraq.
- Operation Auburn Endeavor 1998 – relocation of uranium fuel from Tbilisi, Georgia.
- Operation Determined Falcon 1998 – Show of Force over Albania near Kosovo.
- Operation Calm Support 1998–1999 – Support to Kosovo Diplomatic Observer Mission mission to Kosovo.
- Operation Resolute Response 1998 – Support to US embassy bombings in Kenya and Tanzania.
- Operation Flexible Anvil/Sky Anvil 1998 – Planning for Balkan/Kosovo operations.
- Operation Eagle Eye 1998–1999 – Monitoring compliance with United Nations Security Council Resolution 1199 in Kosovo.
- Operation Desert Fox 1998 – Air Strikes on Iraq.
- Operation Allied Force JTF Noble Anvil 1999 – Air war over Serbia to withdraw forces from Kosovo.

2000s

- Operation Essential Harvest 2001 – Successful NATO program to disarm NLA in Macedonia.
- Operation Enduring Freedom 2001–present – USEUCOM theater planning and execution of the Global War on Terrorism.
- Operation Avid Recovery 2002 – Explosive Ordance Disposal support to Nigeria.
- Operation Allies Refuge 2021 - Evacuation of certain at-risk Afghan civilians (particularly coalition-allied interpreters), employees of the American embassy in Kabul, and other prospective applicants for the U.S. Special Immigrant Visa (SIV) from Afghanistan.

== Structure ==
Surface-based geographic combatant commands' areas of responsibility

The main service component commands of EUCOM are the United States Army Europe, United States Naval Forces Europe/U.S. Sixth Fleet, United States Air Forces in Europe and United States Marine Corps Forces, Europe

United States Army Europe (formerly Seventh Army) is based in Germany. It controls two brigades, one aviation brigade, and several supporting units while also providing support to other Army units in Europe. Previously it had two divisions, although for almost all of the Cold War it controlled two corps of two divisions each. V Corps was deactivated in 2013 upon its return from Afghanistan. VII Corps was deactivated in 1992 after returning to Germany after the Gulf War.

The Sixth Fleet provides ships to NATO Joint Force Command Naples' Operation Active Endeavour, deterring threats to shipping in the Straits of Gibraltar and the remainder of the Mediterranean. Joint Task Force Aztec Silence, a special operations force established under the command of Commander, Sixth Fleet, has been involved in fighting Operation Enduring Freedom - Trans Sahara. It also has a growing role around the shores of West and East Africa, under the direction of United States Africa Command. It previously had a significant Mediterranean presence function against the Soviet Navy's 5th Operational Squadron (Mediterranean Squadron, effectively fleet sized), and for most of the Cold War was the most powerful maritime striking force along NATO's southern flank.

The United States Air Forces in Europe, the Wing-support command, and Third Air Force, USAFE's Warfighting Headquarters are both based at Ramstein Air Base in Germany. They are now much reduced from their high Cold War strength and provide a pool of airpower closer to many trouble spots than aircraft flying from the United States.

The United States Marine Corps Forces, Europe is headquartered in Panzer Kaserne in Böblingen (Stuttgart), Germany, and serves as the Marine Corps component of EUCOM. MARFOREUR is integral in the planning and execution of Black Sea Rotational Force.

A subordinate unified command of EUCOM is SOCEUR (Special Operations Command Europe), headquartered at Patch Barracks in Stuttgart-Vaihingen, Germany. Special forces units within the AOR include the 352nd Special Operations Group of the USAF, based at RAF Mildenhall in the UK, a U.S. Navy SEALs unit, and Naval Special Warfare Unit 2 and 1st BN, 10th Special Forces Group located at Panzer Kaserne, Germany.

EUCOM is also headquartered at Patch Barracks in Stuttgart-Vaihingen, Germany.

The Kaiserslautern Military Community is the largest U.S. community outside of the U.S., while the Landstuhl Regional Medical Center is the largest U.S. military hospital overseas, treating wounded Soldiers from Iraq and Afghanistan.

=== Service components ===
- United States Army Europe (USAREUR) (Lucius D. Clay Kaserne, Wiesbaden, Germany):
  - 2nd Stryker Cavalry Regiment: Rose Barracks, Vilseck, Germany
  - 173rd Airborne Brigade Combat Team: Vicenza, Italy
  - 12th Combat Aviation Brigade: Katterbach Kaserne, Ansbach, Germany
  - 7th Army Joint Multinational Training Command: Grafenwoehr, Germany
  - US Army NATO Brigade: Heuberg Kaserne, Sembach, Germany
  - 19th Battlefield Coordination Detachment: Kaiserslautern, Germany
  - 10th Army Air & Missile Defense Command: Kaiserslautern, Germany
  - 21st Theater Sustainment Command: Panzer Kaserne, Kaiserslautern, Germany
    - 16th Sustainment Brigade: Smith Barracks, Baumholder, Germany
    - 18th Military Police Brigade: Grafenwoehr, Germany
    - 30th Medical Brigade: Sembach, Germany
    - 7th Mission Support Command: Kaiserslautern, Germany
    - 1st Human Resources Sustainment Center
    - 405th Army Field Support Brigade: Daenner Kaserne, Kaiserslautern, Germany
    - 409th Contracting Support Brigade: Kaiserslautern, Germany
    - 266th Financial Management Support Center
- United States Naval Forces Europe (NAVEUR) (Naples, Italy):
  - United States Sixth Fleet (Naples, Italy)
  - Navy Region Europe (Naples, Italy)
- United States Air Forces in Europe (USAFE) (Ramstein Air Base, Germany):
  - Third Air Force (Ramstein Air Base, Germany)
    - 31st Fighter Wing, Aviano Air Base, Italy
    - 48th Fighter Wing, RAF Lakenheath, United Kingdom
    - 52nd Fighter Wing, Spangdahlem Air Base, Germany
    - 86th Airlift Wing, Ramstein Air Base, Germany
    - 100th Air Refueling Wing, RAF Mildenhall, United Kingdom
    - 406th Air Expeditionary Wing, Ramstein Air Base, Germany
    - 435th Air Ground Operations Wing, Ramstein Air Base, Germany
    - 501st Combat Support Wing, RAF Fairford, United Kingdom
    - 39th Air Base Wing, Incirlik Air Base, Turkey
    - Heavy Airlift Wing, Pápa Air Base, Hungary
- United States Marine Corps Forces, Europe (MARFOREUR) (Panzer Kaserne, Böblingen, Germany)
- United States Space Forces – Europe and Africa (SPACEFOREUR-AF) (Ramstein AB, Germany)

U.S. European Command administers the low-profile U.S. military storage installations in Israel. William Arkin in his book Code Names revealed the locations of some of the American bases in Israel. Arkin writes that the sites do not appear on maps, and their exact locations are classified. According to the book, some of the sites are located at Ben Gurion Airport, Nevatim, Ovda air base, and in Herzliya Pituah.

The sites are numbered as "site 51," "site 53," "site 54," "site 55" and "site 56." Some of the depots are underground, others were built as open hangars. According to Arkin, site 51 holds ammunition and equipment in underground depots. Site 53 is munitions storage and war reserve vehicles at Israeli Air Force bases, site 54 is an emergency military hospital near Tel Aviv with 500 beds, and Sites 55 and 56 are ammunition depots.

=== Subordinate unified commands ===
- Special Operations Command Europe (SOCEUR) – (Panzer Kaserne, Böblingen, Germany)

=== Additional supporting units ===
- George C. Marshall European Center for Security Studies (Garmisch, Germany)
- NATO School (Oberammergau, Germany)
- Joint Intelligence Operations Center Europe Analytic Center (RAF Molesworth, Huntingdonshire, UK)

== List of commanders ==
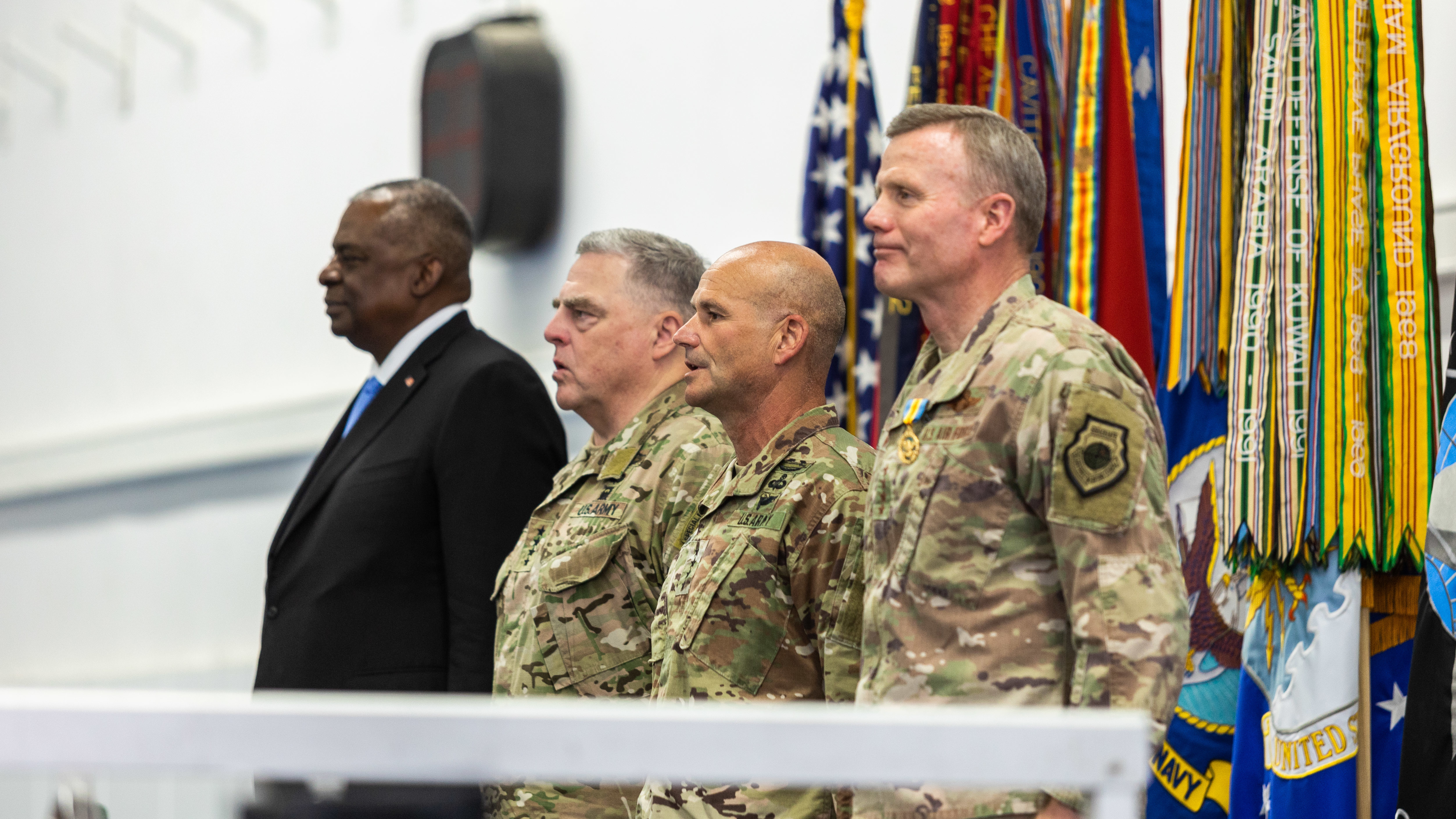
Attendants during the playing of the Armed Forces Medley at the USEUCOM change of command ceremony on 1 July 2022, where Christopher G. Cavoli (second from right) assumed command from Tod D. Wolters (far right).

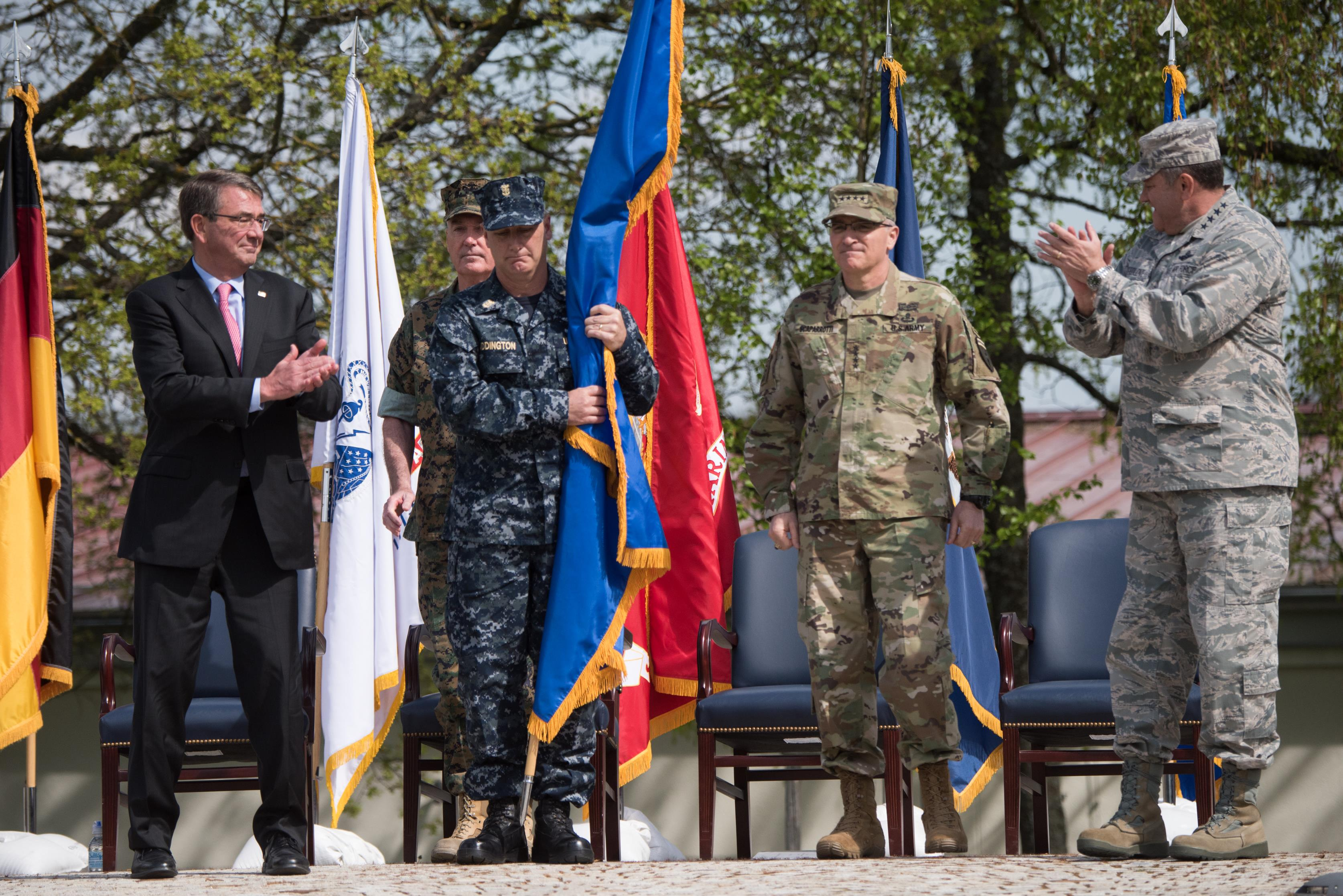
U.S. Secretary of Defense Ash Carter (far left), outgoing combatant commander Philip M. Breedlove (far right), chairman of the Joint Chiefs of Staff Joseph Dunford (background, obscured) applaud the new commander, Curtis Scaparrotti at the USEUCOM change of command ceremony on 3 May 2016.

Previously, this position held the title "Commander-in-Chief (CINC), United States European Command". However, following an order dated 24 October 2002 by Secretary of Defense Donald Rumsfeld, all CINCs in the United States military were retitled "Commanders" and the use of "CINC" as an acronym for anyone other than the President was forbidden.

No.	Commander		Term			Service branch
No.	Portrait	Name	Took office	Left office	Duration	Service branch
As Commander-in-Chief (CINC), United States European Command
1	Matthew Ridgway	General; Matthew Ridgway (1895–1993)	30 May 1952	11 July 1953	1 year, 42 days	U.S. Army
2	Alfred Gruenther	General; Alfred Gruenther (1899–1983)	11 July 1953	20 November 1956	3 years, 132 days	U.S. Army
3	Lauris Norstad	General; Lauris Norstad (1907–1988)	20 November 1956	1 November 1962	5 years, 346 days	U.S. Air Force
4	Lyman Lemnitzer	General; Lyman Lemnitzer (1899–1988)	1 November 1962	1 July 1969	6 years, 242 days	U.S. Army
5	Andrew Goodpaster	General; Andrew Goodpaster (1915–2005)	1 July 1969	15 December 1974	5 years, 167 days	U.S. Army
6	Alexander M. Haig Jr.	General; Alexander M. Haig Jr. (1924–2010)	15 December 1974	1 July 1979	4 years, 198 days	U.S. Army
7	Bernard W. Rogers	General; Bernard W. Rogers (1921–2008)	1 July 1979	26 June 1987	7 years, 360 days	U.S. Army
8	John Galvin	General; John Galvin (1929–2015)	26 June 1987	23 June 1992	4 years, 363 days	U.S. Army
9	John Shalikashvili	General; John Shalikashvili (1936–2011)	23 June 1992	22 October 1993	1 year, 121 days	U.S. Army
10	George Joulwan	General; George Joulwan (born 1939)	22 October 1993	11 July 1997	3 years, 262 days	U.S. Army
11	Wesley Clark	General; Wesley Clark (born 1944)	11 July 1997	3 May 2000	2 years, 297 days	U.S. Army
12	Joseph Ralston	General; Joseph Ralston (born 1943)	3 May 2000	17 January 2003	2 years, 259 days	U.S. Air Force
13	James L. Jones	General; James L. Jones (born 1943)	17 January 2003	7 December 2006	3 years, 324 days	U.S. Marine Corps
As Commander, United States European Command
14	Bantz J. Craddock	General; Bantz J. Craddock (born 1949)	7 December 2006	2 July 2009	2 years, 207 days	U.S. Army
15	James G. Stavridis	Admiral; James G. Stavridis (born 1955)	2 July 2009	13 May 2013	3 years, 315 days	U.S. Navy
16	Philip M. Breedlove	General; Philip M. Breedlove (born 1955)	13 May 2013	4 May 2016	2 years, 357 days	U.S. Air Force
17	Curtis M. Scaparrotti	General; Curtis M. Scaparrotti (born 1956)	4 May 2016	3 May 2019	2 years, 364 days	U.S. Army
18	Tod D. Wolters	General; Tod D. Wolters (born 1960)	3 May 2019	1 July 2022	3 years, 59 days	U.S. Air Force
19	Christopher G. Cavoli	General; Christopher G. Cavoli (born c. 1964)	1 July 2022	1 July 2025	3 years, 0 days	U.S. Army
20	Alexus G. Grynkewich	General; Alexus G. Grynkewich (born 1971)	1 July 2025	Incumbent	1 year, 118 days	U.S. Air Force
