= Herman C. Wallace =

Herman Claudious Wallace
- Born: June 12, 1924; Marlow, Oklahoma, U.S.
- Died: February 27, 1945 (aged 20) near Prümzurlay, Germany
- Burial place: City of Lubbock Cemetery, Texas
- Education: Texas Tech University (no degree)
- Military career
- Allegiance: United States of America
- Branch: United States Army
- Service years: 1943 - 1945
- Rank: Private First Class
- Units: 301st Engineer Combat Battalion, 76th Infantry Division
- Conflicts: World War II
- Awards: Medal of Honor; Purple Heart

Herman Claudious Wallace (June 12, 1924– February 27, 1945) was a United States Army soldier and a recipient of the United States military's highest decoration—the Medal of Honor—for his actions in World War II.

Wallace was born on June 12, 1924, in Marlow, Oklahoma. He graduated from Lubbock High School in Lubbock, Texas, in 1942 and enrolled as an engineering major at Texas Technological College (now Texas Tech University) later that year. He joined the Army from Lubbock in June 1943, and by February 27, 1945, was serving as a private first class in Company B, 301st Engineer Combat Battalion, 76th Infantry Division. On that day, during demining operations near Prümzurlay in western Germany, Wallace stepped on an S-mine. Knowing that if he tried to run away the mine would pop up and explode a few feet off the ground, thus endangering the soldiers near him, he deliberately remained standing on the mine until it detonated. Wallace was killed in the explosion, but the blast was confined to the ground and no other soldiers were injured. He was posthumously awarded the Medal of Honor eight months later, on October 25, 1945.

Wallace, aged 20 at his death, was buried in the City of Lubbock Cemetery, Lubbock, Texas.

== Medal of Honor citation ==
Private First Class Wallace's official Medal of Honor citation reads:

He displayed conspicuous gallantry and intrepidity. While helping clear enemy mines from a road, he stepped on a well-concealed S-type antipersonnel mine. Hearing the characteristic noise indicating that the mine had been activated and, if he stepped aside, would be thrown upward to explode above ground and spray the area with fragments, surely killing 2 comrades directly behind him and endangering other members of his squad, he deliberately placed his other foot on the mine even though his best chance for survival was to fall prone. Pvt. Wallace was killed when the charge detonated, but his supreme heroism at the cost of his life confined the blast to the ground and his own body and saved his fellow soldiers from death or injury.

— Harry S. Truman

== Honors ==
Wallace Theater on Fort Belvoir, Virginia, was named after him upon dedication April 4, 1950.

The former U.S. Army installation Wallace Barracks in the Bad Cannstatt district of Stuttgart, Germany was named after him during the Cold War.

== See also ==
- List of Medal of Honor recipients
- List of Medal of Honor recipients for World War II
