= Patch Barracks =

US military installation in Stuttgart-Vaihingen, Germany

Coordinates: 48°44′11″N 9°04′52″E

Location in Germany

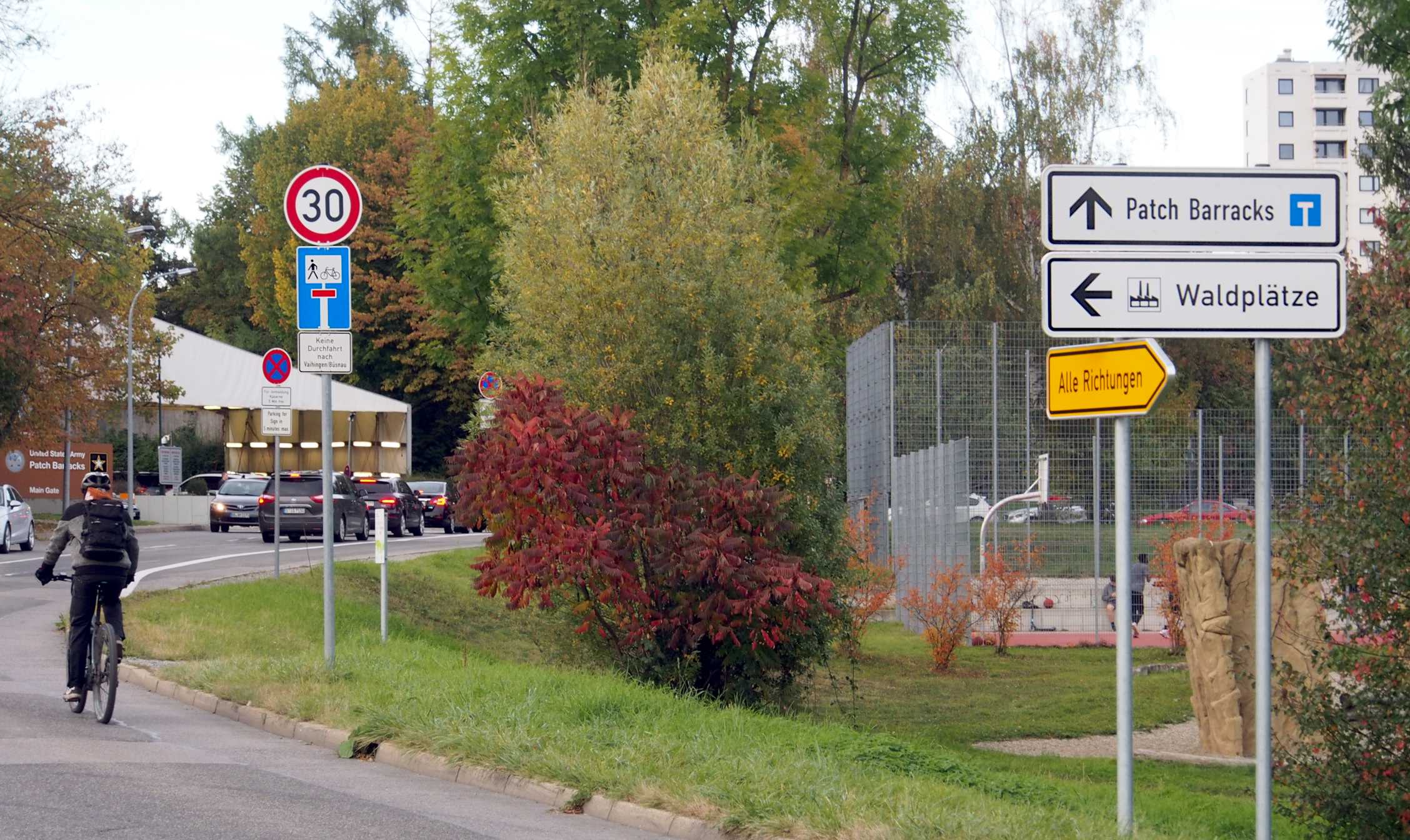
Main approach

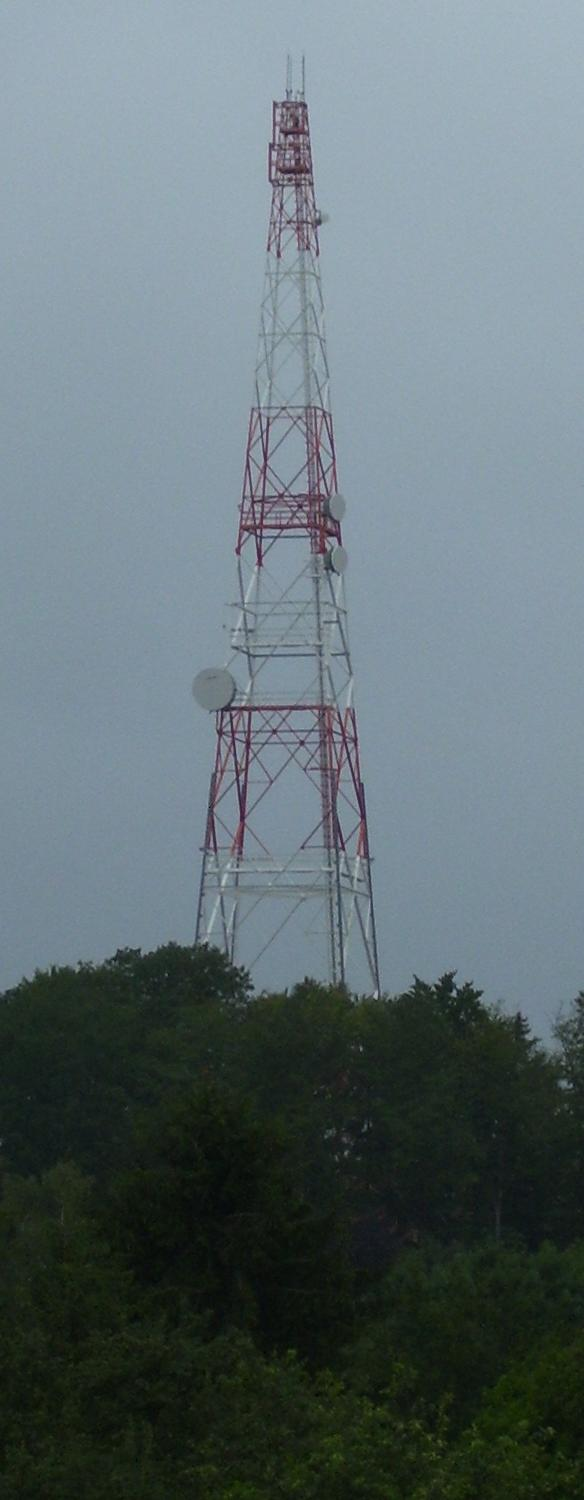
Former Relay Tower

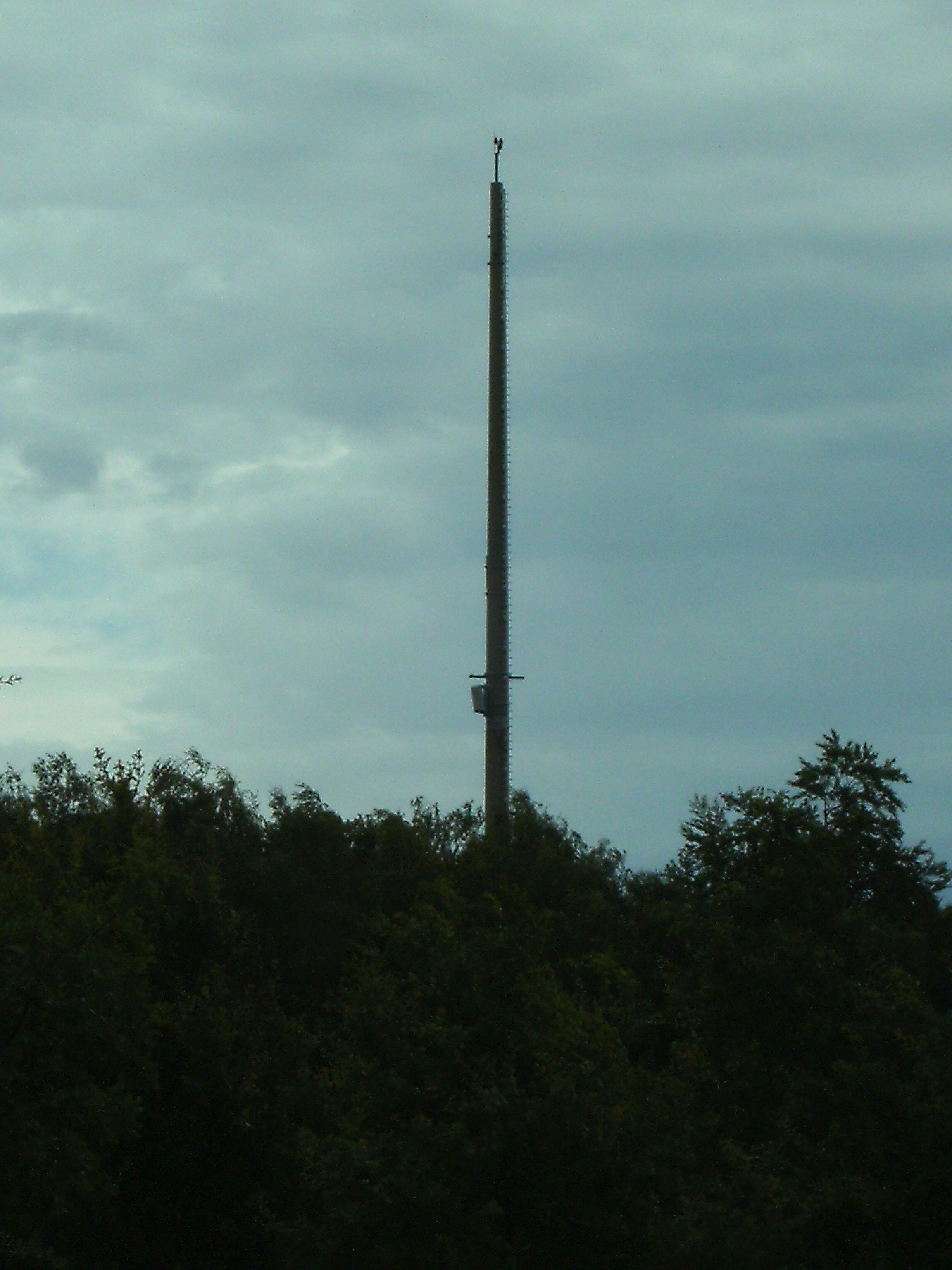
New radio mast

Patch Barracks is a U.S. military installation in Stuttgart, Germany. It is named after U.S. Army General Alexander M. Patch (1889–1945).

== History ==
Patch Barracks was renamed from the German Kurmärker Kaserne in 1952; it was originally built for use by the German Army (Heer) in 1936–1937. During World War II, it served as the headquarters and barracks for the Wehrmacht's 7th Panzer Regiment, with associated unit shooting ranges and training areas located at the nearby Panzer Kaserne (literally "tank barracks").

After the Second World War, Kurmärker Kaserne was temporarily occupied by French colonial troops. Subsequently, American troops took over the facility, which hosted the U.S. Constabulary during the multilateral occupation of Germany following the war. The Seventh Army was headquartered here from 1950 until 1967, when EUCOM was relocated to Patch from Camp-des-Loges near Paris, France, and the 7th Army relocated to Heidelberg.

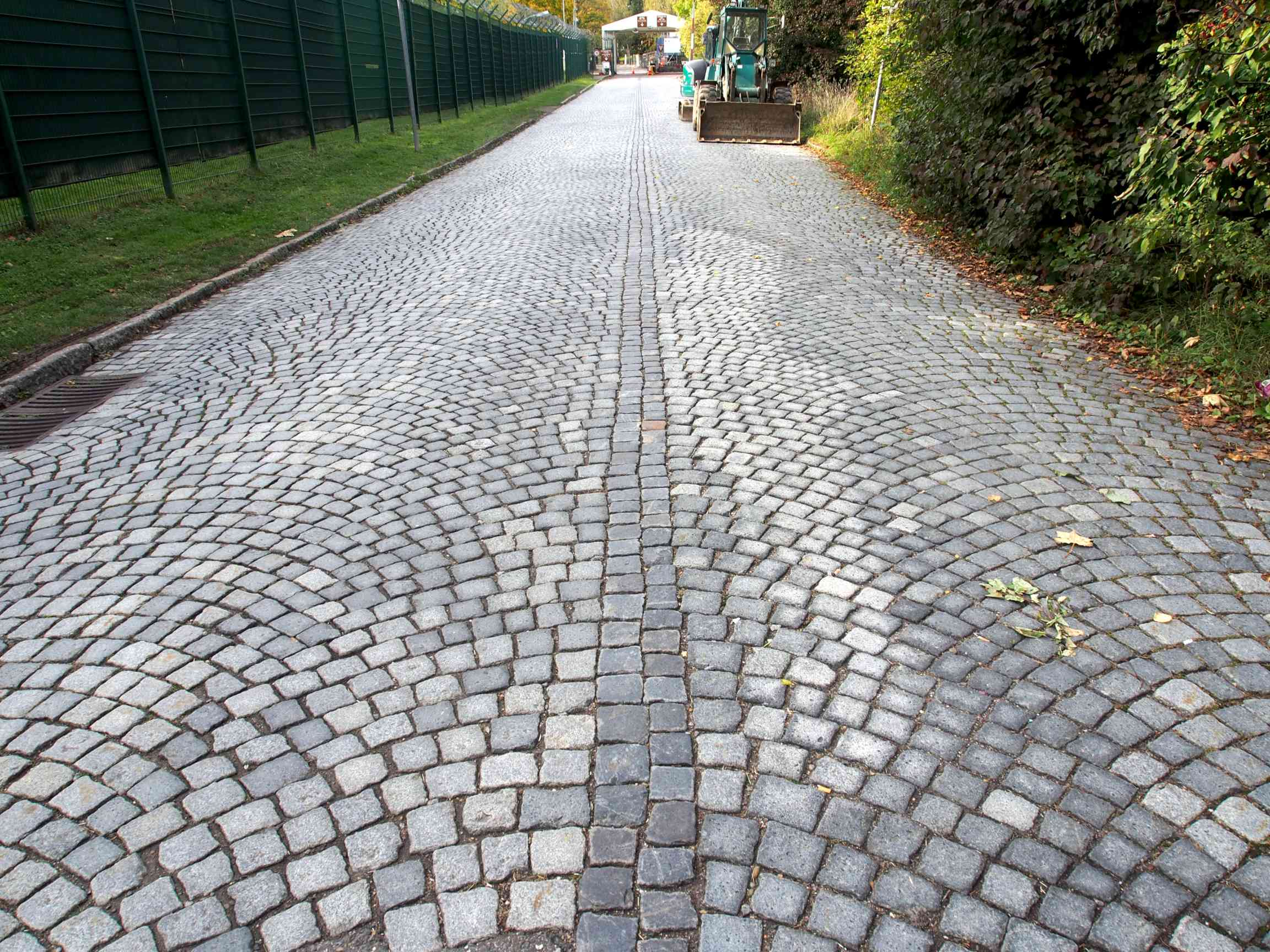
Access to the K&K gate via the old tank trail from 1938

== Current units assigned ==
- U.S. European Command (EUCOM).This is the Department of Defense Unified Combatant Command for Europe and Northern Asia.
- Special Operations Command, Europe (SOCEUR) which commands US Special Operations Forces units in Europe.
- Defense Information Systems Agency
- Defense Information Technology Contracting Organization
- NSA/CSS Representative Europe office (NCEUR)

== Education ==
DODEA (formerly DoDDS) operates Patch Middle School for the dependents of service members. High school students attend Stuttgart High School (SHS), opened in 2015, on Panzer Kaserne in Böblingen. Patch Barracks hosted Patch American High School (PAHS) from 1979 to 2015,

Another predecessor, Stuttgart American High School (SAHS), began in 1953 at Robinson Barracks, relocated to Pattonville two years later, and closed in 1992.

== Recent history ==
AFRICOM was started as a cell within EUCOM and then separated and assigned to nearby Kelley Barracks. The main community PX was relocated to nearby Panzer Kaserne in 2007 due to a lack of parking for both EUCOM staff and the PX shoppers. Other recent activity includes renovations to the housing on base. A highly conspicuous 314-foot (96 m) radio tower, familiar to generations of staff and visitors, was dismantled in May 2009.

In 2022 Patch Barracks hosted the International Donors Co-ordination Cell (IDCC), the joint international effort to supply Ukraine with military equipment to defend itself during the 2022 Russian invasion of Ukraine.

== See also ==
- Patch American High School (1979–2015)
- List of United States Army installations in Germany
