= Panzer Kaserne =

US military installation in Böblingen, Germany

Coordinates: 48.6818°N 9.046°E

Location in Germany

Panzer Kaserne (or Camp Panzer Kaserne) is a U.S. military installation in Böblingen, Germany, part of U.S. Army Garrison Stuttgart. The post is administered by U.S. Army Installation Management Command – Europe (IMCOM–Europe), a legacy from its use as an Army installation since just after World War II. Panzer also hosts the headquarters of U.S. Marine Corps Forces, Europe & Africa (MARFOREURAF) and various Special Operations units of the Army and Navy supporting EUCOM and AFRICOM. There is also a different Panzer Kaserne in Kaiserslautern, Germany

== History ==
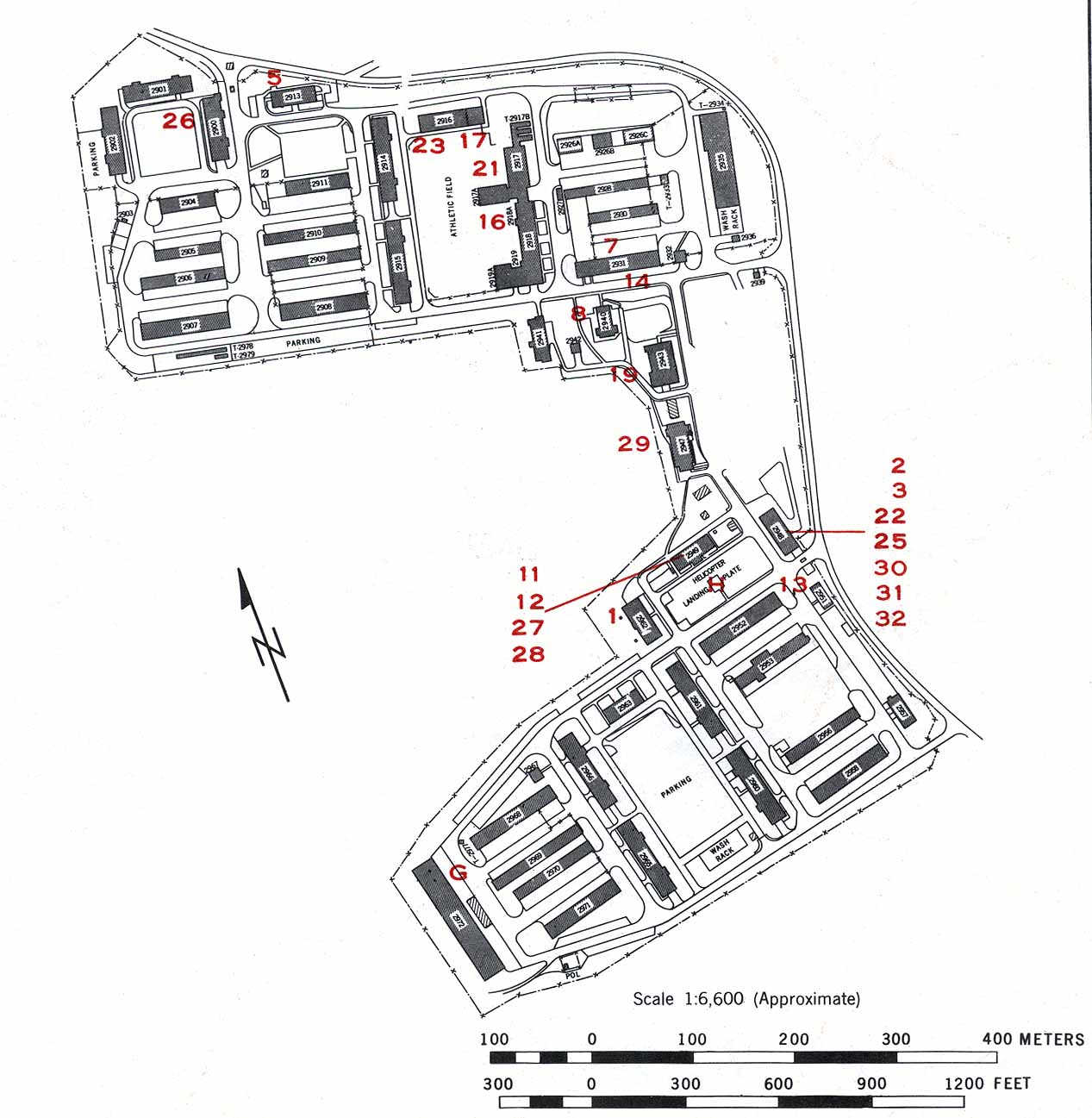
Map of Panzer Kaserne during the 1970s

Panzer Kaserne and nearby Patch Barracks were constructed in 1938 for the German Army, Panzer Regiment 7, 8 as well as Panzer Brigade 4 was stationed in Panzer Barracks from April 1938 (and both bases were joined by a specially designed trail due to the weight of tank traffic.) Additionally, the training areas were designed to train and test the new tank crews who were assigned to the 8th Panzer Regiment. There is also a small nearby training area, unusual for a Kaserne in an urban or suburban area.

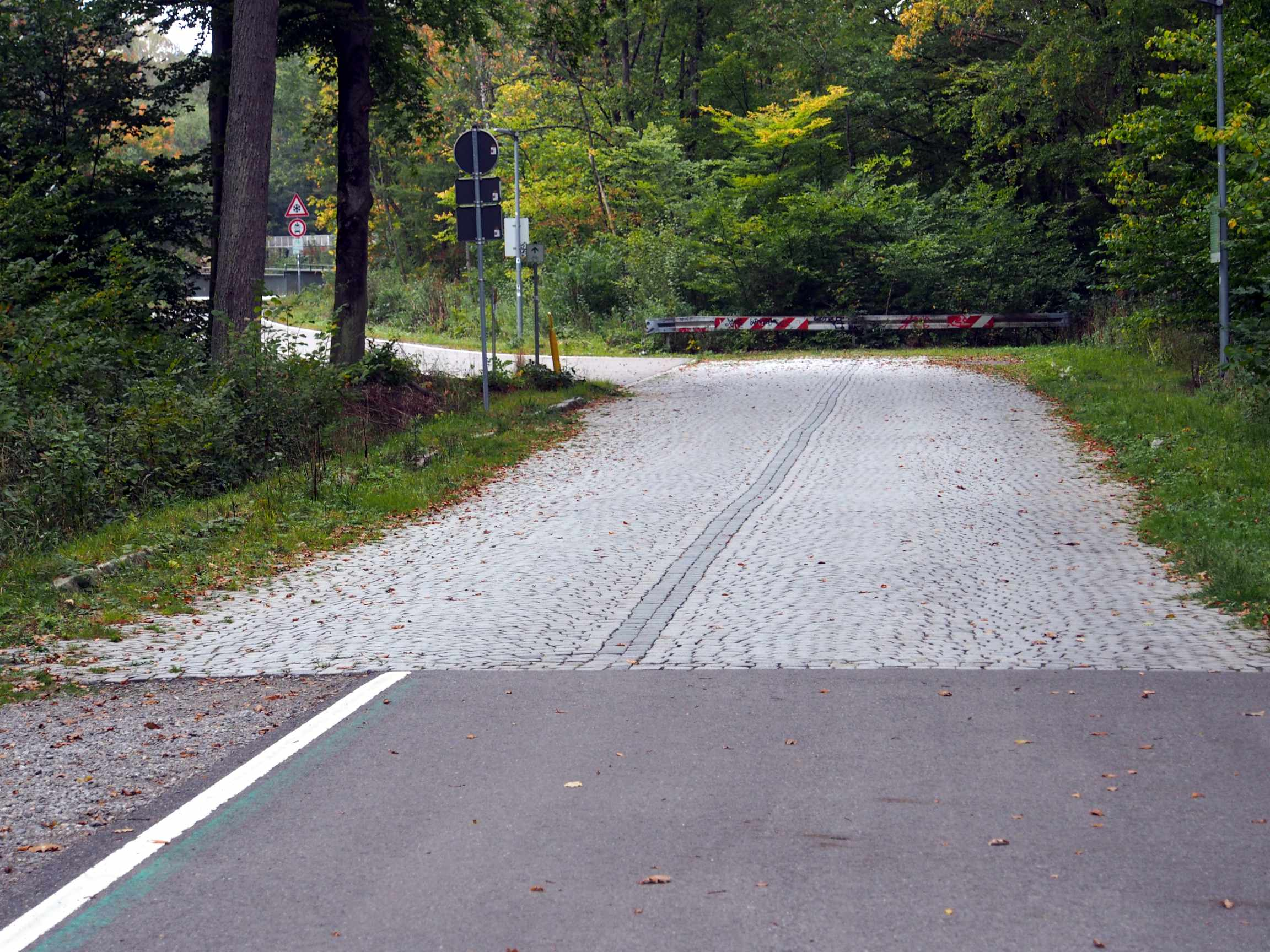
Relic of the sett-paved tank trail

The 8th Panzer Regiment was the first unit assigned to the then Hindenburg-Ludendorff Kaserne. Local legend suggests that Adolf Hitler may have even delivered a speech from within the former Nazi Officer's Club building. Additional myths suggest that Panzer and nearby base of Patch, were used for testing of new and experimental Nazi technology, specifically tank modifications and improvements. Added to that, there is a myth that experimental tanks were disposed of by burial to prevent capture by advancing US troops. No one can verify for certain when the U.S. Forces accepted the transfer of the barracks, but it is believed it occurred in early July 1945.

During the Cold War, various units were assigned to Panzer, most notably units of the 1st ID (Forward), a forward detached element of the 3rd Brigade 1st Infantry Division until 1990.

Most currently assigned units are devoted to the support of U.S. European Command (EUCOM) at Patch Barracks and United States Africa Command (AFRICOM) at Kelley Barracks located in Stuttgart.

== Units currently assigned ==
- 1st Battalion, 10th Special Forces Group (Airborne)
- Naval Special Warfare Unit Two
- Naval Special Warfare Unit Ten
- Special Operations Command, Europe
- 554th Military Police Company, 709th Military Police Battalion, 18 Military Police Brigade, 21st Theater Sustainment Command, US Army
- United States Marine Corps Forces, Europe and Africa
- POND Guard Force (composed of local nationals)
- Federal Base Police

== Base services ==
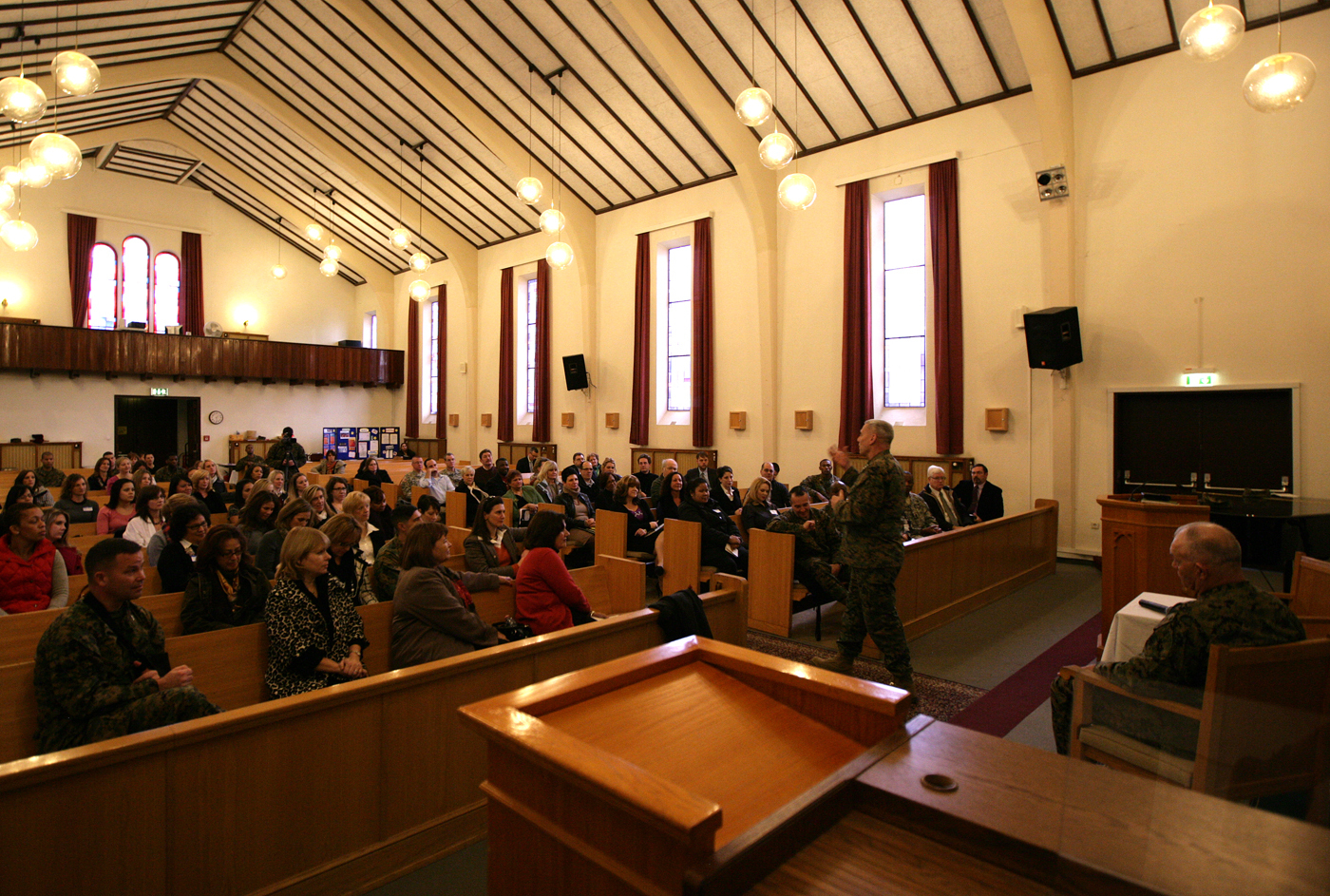
The chapel at Panzer Kaserne during a town hall meeting for dependents and community leaders

=== Education ===
Panzer is host to a DODEA Elementary, middle, and high school for dependent children and is served by nearby Stuttgart High School (formerly Patch American High School, 1979–2015). The International School of Stuttgart also operates a private Pre-K to 9th Grade dual-language school in nearby Sindelfingen as ISS BaSICS. The same school has an IB K-12 school located in Stuttgart district of Degerloch.

=== Shopping ===
The Base Exchange opened a new main shopping center for the Stuttgart Military Community at Panzer to replace the facility at nearby Patch Barracks. The 140,000-square-foot (13,000 m^{2}) facility is organized like a mall. Panzer hosts a commissary and is also served by similar facilities at Patch and Kelley Barracks. Panzer has been selected as the site of a newer, more modern commissary, which will make Panzer the center for shopping in the area of the four bases: Panzer, Patch, Kelley, and Robinson.

=== Transport ===
Panzer Kaserne is served by the Stuttgart VVS bus service and two nearby light rail stops in Böblingen. Rumor has it MPs stashed dozens of bicycles from Amsterdam in the surrounding forest, and throughout town for use during late night pub crawls.

== See also ==
- List of United States Army installations in Germany
