= Kelley Barracks =

U.S. military base in Germany

Coordinates: 48°43′26″N 9°10′45″E

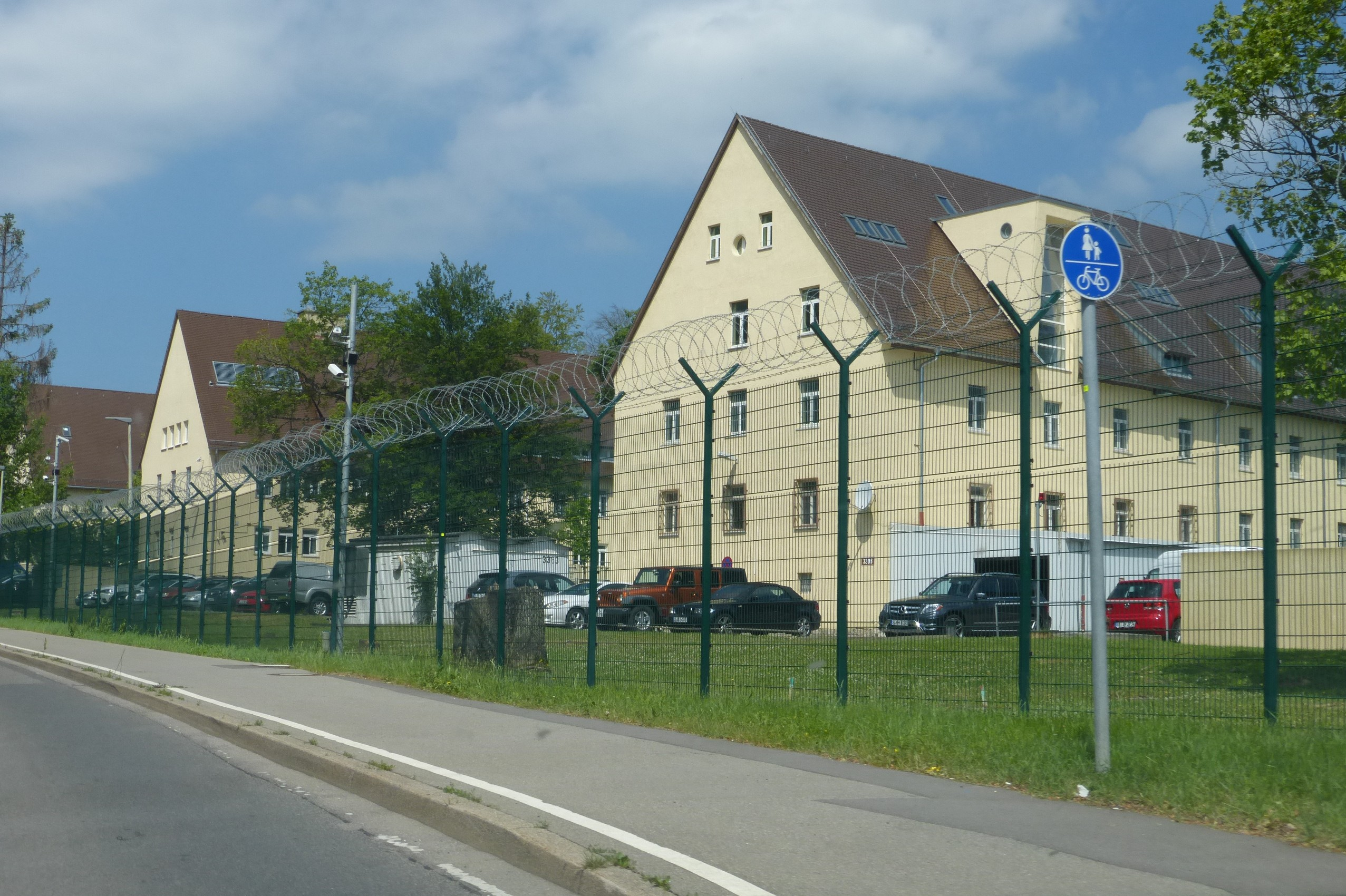
Kelley Barracks, Stuttgart-Möhringen

Kelley Barracks (formerly Helenen-Kaserne) is a U.S. military installation and headquarters of United States Africa Command, and is a part of US Army Garrison Stuttgart in Stuttgart-Möhringen in Germany. The post is administered by IMCOM- Europe.

== History ==
=== World War II and the American Postwar Occupation ===
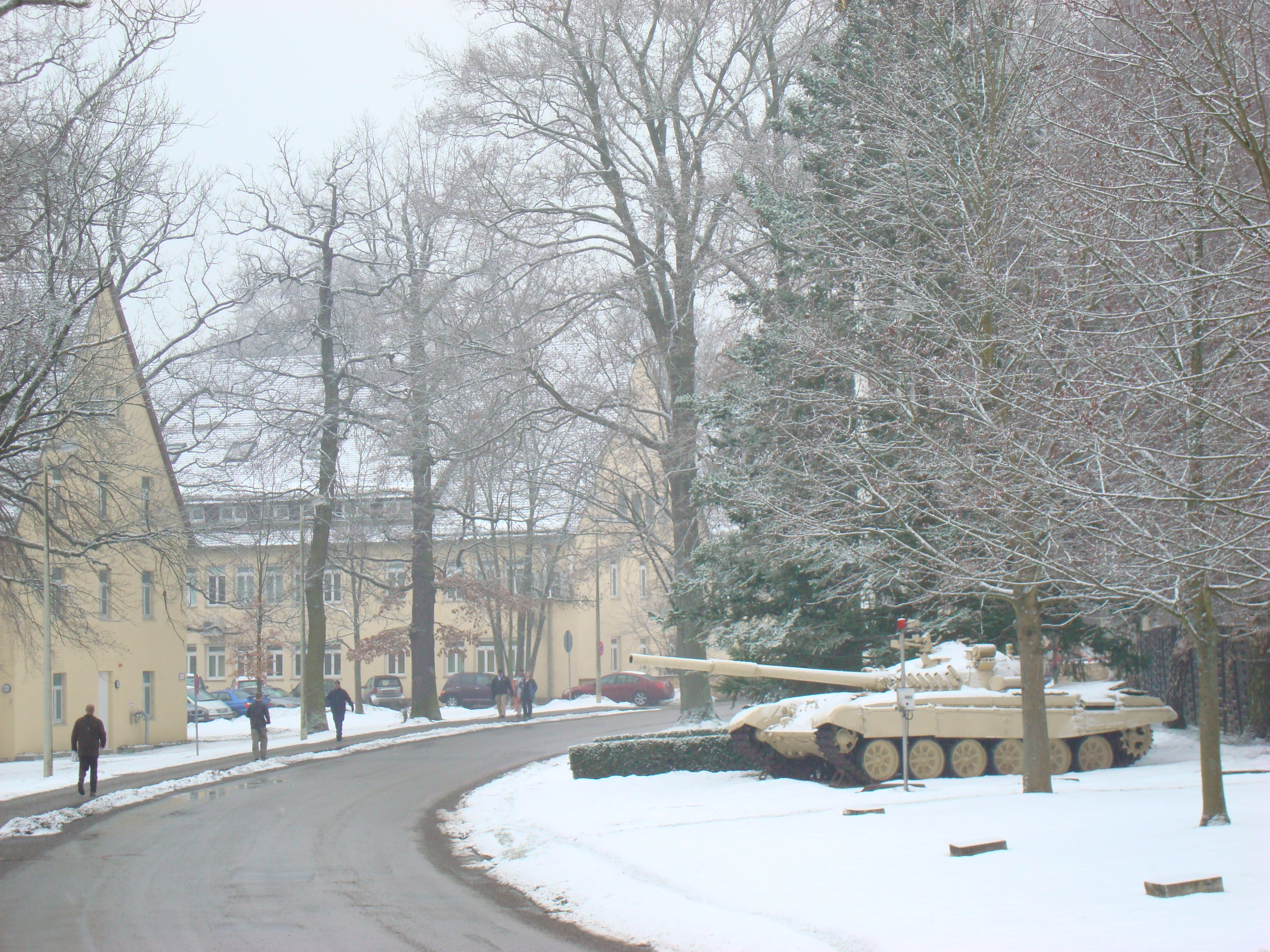
Gulf War T-72 Iraqi Tank as part of VII Corps Memorial on Oak Street at Kelley.

Located in the outer Stuttgart district of Möhringen, Helenen Kaserne (the German name for the installation) officially opened May 7, 1938, housing members of the 5th Air Signal Regiment of the Luftwaffe. On December 5, 1945 Helenen Kaserne became an American installation, initially part of Stuttgart Post. The 7700th Troop Information and Education Group of the US Army became the first permanently assigned unit in 1947. From 1948 to 1951 the US Constabulary occupied the post.

=== Cold War and Gulf War ===
In November 1951, Helenen Kaserne became the headquarters of the reactivated VII Corps. In September 1949 Helenen Kaserne was renamed by Brigadier General Arnold J. Funk to the Kelley Barracks in honor of Staff Sergeant Jonah E. Kelley, of the 78th Infantry Division, who was posthumously awarded the Medal of Honor for actions occurring at Kesternich, Germany in January 1945 during the Second Battle of Kesternich. From 1951 until the headquarters deactivated in 1992 (following its return from the Gulf War), VII Corps was headquartered at the base. In remembrance of the 41-year history of VII Corps at Kelley during the Cold War and Gulf War, an M4 Sherman tank and a Gulf War era T-72 Iraqi tank flank the main flagpole along with the seal of VII Corps on the main street (Oak Street) of the installation. The tanks were removed in 2018. A segment of the Berlin Wall is also displayed as a memorial.

U.S. Africa Command HQ.

The 602nd Air Support Operations Group of the United States Air Force was stationed at Kelley Barracks in support of the VII Corps HQ and subordinate units until the inactivation of VII Corps in 1992.

=== 1992 to present ===
Following the large drawdown of US forces after the Cold War and Gulf War, Kelley was used as headquarters for the 6th ASG (Area Support Group), now US Army Garrison-Stuttgart. An 8-story Guest house was opened in 2001 to house transient personnel and visitors to the Stuttgart Military Community. In February 2007, Kelley Barracks was designated to house the Transition Team of United States Africa Command and became the permanent headquarters when the command was activated on October 1, 2008. Kelley Barracks was scheduled to close in 2009, but the Army has spent hundreds of millions of dollars upgrading the base for Africa Command, while telling Congress that it is just a temporary home. In February 2013, the Pentagon announced that AFRICOM will remain in Germany, ending efforts to relocate the command to the United States.

Due to heightened security at all installations, the Main Entrance Gate - used since opening in 1938 - is being replaced to conform to current force protection standards.

It currently employs approximately 1,700 soldiers, US civil service, local nationals and contractors.

== Base services ==
=== Recreation and shopping ===
Kelley has a commissary but lacks a post exchange; the main AAFES Exchange is located nearby at Panzer Kaserne. The installation hosts a variety of athletic facilities, a theater and recreation center. Kelley is located near the SI-Centrum entertainment complex which offers a wide variety of entertainment.

=== Education and childcare ===
Dependent children housed at Kelley must leave the installation for school as Kelley is the only installation in the Stuttgart Military Community lacking DODEA schools. The US DODEA operates Elementary schools at nearby Robinson Barracks, Patch Barracks and Panzer Kaserne. The US DODEA also operates one middle school Patch Middle School which is located on Patch Barracks which used to be the old Alexander M. Patch High School before it closed in June of 2015. The current high school opened in late 2015 named Stuttgart High School which is located on Panzer Kaserne. There is another school called International School of Stuttgart that is located nearby. MWR Stuttgart Family Child Care operates daycare services on Kelley.

=== Medical care ===
A small Clinic annex operates with limited services for eligible personnel.

=== Kelley Hotel ===
Kelley Hotel is a 68-room hotel on post at Kelley Barracks. Like other DoD hotels, Kelley Hotel has many amenities.

=== Transit ===
The Stuttgart Stadtbahn (U-Bahn) has a station nearby (Landhaus) as well as bus stations at the north and south entrances to the post, allowing residents easy access to the public transit system.

== Other uses ==
Another installation of the same name existed in Darmstadt-West until 2009.

== See also ==
- Panzer Kaserne – US military installation in Böblingen, Germany
- Patch Barracks – US military installation in Stuttgart-Vaihingen, Germany
- Robinson Barracks – U.S. military installation in Stuttgart, Germany
- List of United States Army installations in Germany
