= List of United States Army installations in Germany =

The United States Army has over 40 military installations in Germany, two of which are scheduled to close. Over 220 others have already been closed, mostly following the end of the Cold War in the 1990s. Many were positioned strategically to serve as forward posts, in any war against the USSR. Those bases host approximately 36,400 U.S. troops as of 2026.

== History ==
The United States Armed Forces were initially organized as USFET (U.S. Forces, European Theater), from 1 August 1945 to 28 February 1946 A.D., in Berlin and Frankfurt am Main, in the I.G. Farben building. On 15 March 1947, they were reassigned to EUCOM (European Command) in Frankfurt. In 1948, they moved from Frankfurt to the Campbell Barracks from Heidelberg. On 1 January 1950, it was reorganized as USAREUR (United States Army Europe). USAREUR was subordinate to USEUCOM (United States European Command), since 1967, at the Patch Barracks from Stuttgart-Vaihingen.

According to the German Bundestag, U.S. forces in Germany in the early 2010s numbered approximately 40,000–45,000 personnel, depending on whether stationed forces or broader assigned personnel were counted. This reflected a long-term post–Cold War decline from much higher Cold War-era levels exceeding 70,000 troops.

In June 2020, President Donald Trump announced plans to reduce the number of U.S. troops stationed in Germany. A month later, Defense Secretary Mark Esper specified that troop levels would be cut to about 24,000, implying a withdrawal of roughly 12,000 personnel, around one third of the force.

The proposal faced criticism in both Germany and the United States, including from the U.S. Congress, which imposed conditions on any withdrawal in the 2021 defense authorization legislation. Following the inauguration of Joe Biden in 2021, the planned reduction was halted, and instead a modest increase of approximately 500 troops was announced.

On 30 April 2026, President Donald Trump again raised the possibility of reducing the approximately 36,400 U.S. troops stationed in Germany amid renewed political tensions with Berlin. According to reporting by The Guardian, a review of troop deployments is under consideration, although analysts note that large-scale reductions remain unlikely due to the strategic importance of U.S. bases in Germany and legal constraints imposed by U.S. defense legislation. A day later, U.S. Defense Secretary Pete Hegseth ordered the withdrawal of around 5,000 American troops stationed in Germany over the next six to 12 months.

=== Polling ===
A 2018 YouGov poll found that 42% of Germans supported a withdrawal, whereas 37% were opposed and 21% undecided. 67% of Die Linke supporters, 55% of Alternative for Germany supporters, and 48% of Greens supporters backed withdrawal. Less supportive of withdrawal were voters for the CDU at 35%, the FDP at 37%, and the SPD at 42%.

An August 2020 YouGov poll found that 47% of Germans were in favor of a 12,000 American troop reduction, 32% supported keeping the current number, and 4% wanted an increase. 25% in the poll supported a full US armed forces withdrawal in Germany. AfD and Die Linke voters were the most supportive of a troop reduction at 61% and 70% respectively; 52% of the Green voters supported troop reduction, as did 52% for the FDP.

== Existing installations ==
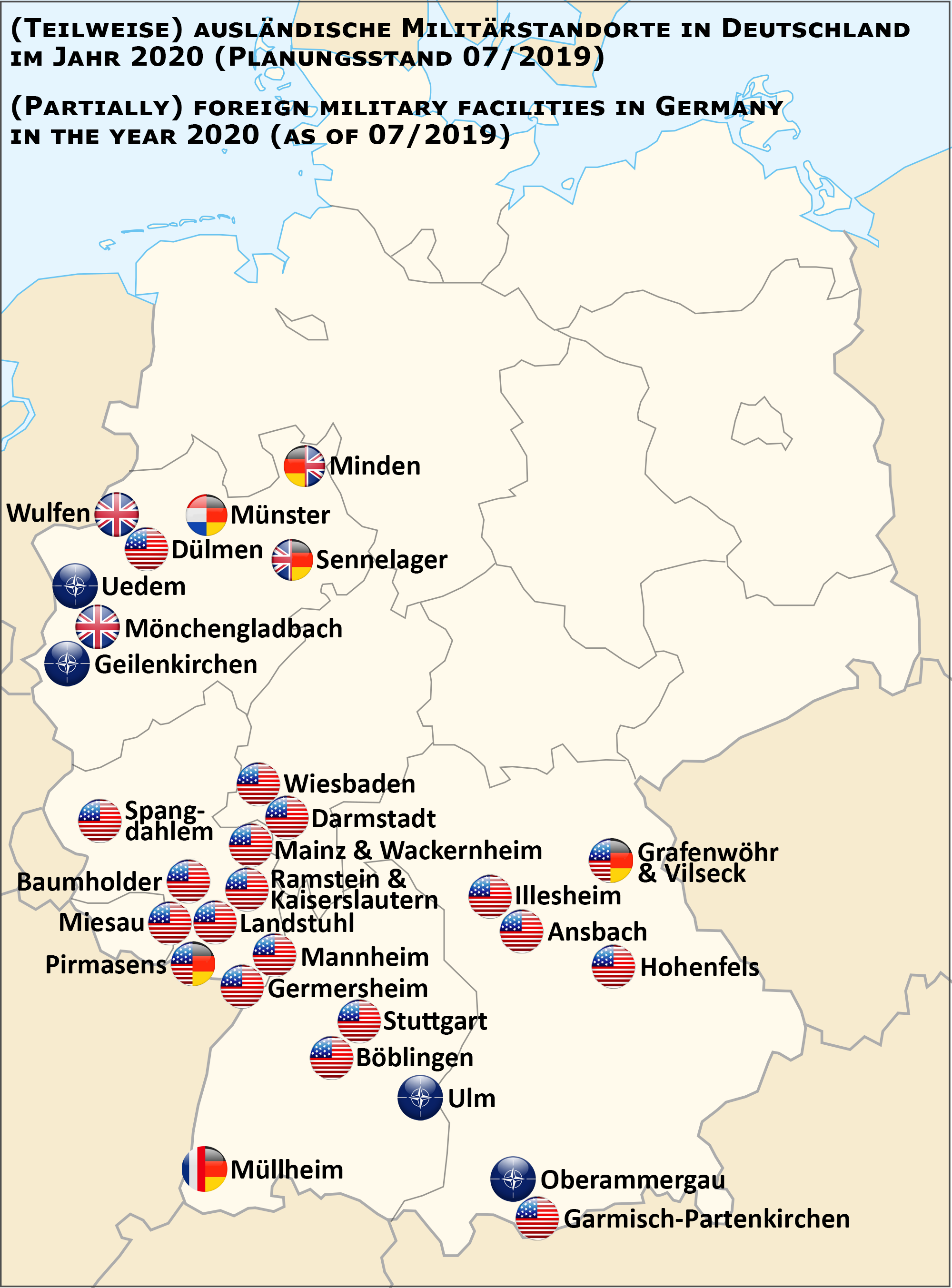
As planned for 2020

1. Artillery Kaserne, Garmisch-Partenkirchen
2. Barton Barracks, Ansbach
3. Bismarck Kaserne, Ansbach
4. Bleidorn Housing Area, Ansbach
5. Coleman Army Airfield/Coleman Barracks, Mannheim
6. Daenner Kaserne, Kaiserslautern
7. Dagger Complex, Darmstadt Training Center Griesheim (scheduled to close after the new one in Wiesbaden is built)
8. Edelweiss Lodge and Resort, Garmisch-Partenkirchen
9. Lucius D. Clay Kaserne (formerly Wiesbaden Army Airfield), Wiesbaden-Erbenheim
10. Franken Kaserne, Near Westheim, Bavaria
11. Germersheim Army Depot, Germersheim
12. Grafenwöhr Training Area, Grafenwöhr/Vilseck
13. Grunstadt Depot, Grunstadt
14. Joint Multinational Readiness Center, Hohenfels (Upper Palatinate)
15. Husterhoeh Kaserne, Pirmasens
16. Kaiserslautern Military Community Base System, Kaiserslautern
17. Katterbach Kaserne, Ansbach
18. Kelley Barracks, Stuttgart
19. Kleber Kaserne, Kaiserslautern
20. Lampertheim training area, Lampertheim, Hesse
21. Landstuhl Regional Medical Center, Landstuhl
22. McCully Barracks, Wackernheim
23. Miesau Army Depot, Miesau
24. Oberdachstetten Storage Area, Ansbach
25. Panzer Kaserne, Kaiserslautern
26. Panzer Kaserne, Böblingen
27. Patch Barracks, Stuttgart
28. Pulaski Barracks, Kaiserslautern
29. Ramstein Air Base, Ramstein-Miesenbach, Rhinland-palatinate
30. Rhine Ordnance Barracks, Kaiserslautern
31. Robinson Barracks, Stuttgart
32. Rose Barracks, Vilseck
33. Sembach Kaserne, Kaiserslautern
34. Sheridan Barracks, Garmisch-Partenkirchen
35. Shipton Kaserne, Ansbach
36. Smith Barracks, Baumholder
37. Spangdahlem Air Force Base, Spangdahlem
38. Storck Barracks, Illesheim
39. Stuttgart Army Airfield, Filderstadt
40. Mainz-Kastel Storage Station
41. U.S.A.G. Wiesbaden Military Training Area, Mainz, Gonsenheim/Mombach
42. U.S.A.G. Wiesbaden Training Area, Mainz Finthen Airport
43. U.S.A.G. Wiesbaden Radar Station, Mainz Finthen Airport
44. Urlas Housing and Shopping Complex, Ansbach (converted from Urlas Training Area in early 2010s)
45. Tower Barracks Dülmen, Dülmen
46. Wetzel barracks, Baumholder

== Former installations ==
U.S. Army units in West Germany, 1987	U.S. military bases in Germany, as of 2008.	Ferris Barracks Memorial to Soldiers of the Erlangen Brigade, from 1945 to 1991

Name	Location	Disposition	Year	Notes
96 Ordnance Company	Mainz-Gonsenheim		1955/56	
97^{th} General Hospital/Clark Kaserne	Frankfurt			became the Frankfurt American General Consulate
Aartal Kaserne	Herborn-Seelbach	closed	1992	
Abrams Complex	Frankfurt	closed	1995	
Alabama Depot	Munich	closed	1965	
Anderson Barracks	Dexheim	closed	2008	
Andrews Barracks	Berlin	closed	1994	
Argonner Kaserne	Hanau	closed	2008	
Armstrong Kaserne	Büdingen	closed	2007	
Artillery Kaserne	Neckarsulm	closed	1991	
Aschaffenburg Local Training Area	Aschaffenburg	closed	2007	
Askren Manors Housing Area	Schweinfurt	closed	2014	
Atterberry Kaserne	Frankfurt	closed	2003	
Augsburg U.S. Army Installations	Augsburg	closed	1998	
Ayers Kaserne	Butzbach-Kirch-Göns	closed	1997	
Azbill Barracks	Rüsselsheim	closed	1993	
Babenhausen Kaserne	Babenhausen	closed	2007	
Bad Aibling Station	Bad Aibling	closed	2004	
Badenerhof Kaserne	Heilbronn	closed	1991	
Bamberg Local Training Area	Bamberg	closed	2014	
Bayern-Kaserne	Munich	transferred to Bundeswehr	1968	
Becelaere Kaserne	Esslingen am Neckar	transferred to Bundeswehr	1956	
Beeskowdamm Compound	Berlin	closed	1994	
Benjamin Franklin Village	Mannheim	closed	2012	
Betts Kaserne	Frankfurt			97 Gen Hosp Barracks and Family Housing
Bismarck Kaserne	Schwäbisch Gmünd	closed	1991	
Bitburg Air Base	Bitburg	closed	1994	
Butzbach Kaserne	Butzbach	closed	2008	
Cambrai-Fritsch Kaserne	Darmstadt	closed	2008	
Campbell Barracks	Heidelberg	closed	2013	this was USAREUR (U.S. ARmy EURope) HQ
Camp Grohn	Bremen	returned to German government		now, the campus of Jacobs University
Camp King	Oberursel	closed	1995	ceremonial closing 1993, actual closing in 1995
Camp May	Regen	closed		
Camp Pieri	Wiesbaden-Dotzheim	closed	c. 1993	
Camp Pitman	Weiden i.d.OPf.	closed	1989	
Camp Reed	Rötz	closed		
Carl Schurz Kaserne	Bremerhaven	closed	1993	named for Carl Schurz
Chiemsee Hotel	Chiemsee	closed	2004	
Christensen Barracks	Bindlach	closed	1992	
Coffey Barracks	Ludwigsburg	closed	1991	
Coleman Kaserne	Gelnhausen	closed	2007	
Conn Barracks	Schweinfurt	closed	2014	
Cooke Barracks	Göppingen	closed	1991	
Cramerton Housing Area	Augsburg	closed	1998	
Daley Barracks	Bad Kissingen	closed	1995	housing area remained until 2005
DEH Compound	Berlin	closed	1994	
De La Marne Barracks	Bingen			
Detachment Meissner	Hoher Meißner	closed	1990s	early 1990s
Dolan Barracks	Schwäbisch Hall	closed	1993	
Doughboy City MOUT	Berlin	closed	1994	demolished mid-1990s
Downs Kaserne	Fulda	closed	1994	
Dragoner Kaserne	Mainz	closed	1992	
Drake Kaserne	Frankfurt	closed	1992	
Dueppel Housing Area	Berlin	closed	1994	
Eastman Barracks	Dachau	closed	1972	
Edwards Kaserne	Frankfurt	closed	1992	
Emery Barracks	Würzburg	closed	1990	
Ernst Ludwig Kaserne	Darmstadt	closed	1996	demolished in 2002
Eschborn Kaserne	Eschborn, Frankfurt			Camp Eschborn
Faulenberg Kaserne	Würzburg	closed	2008	
Ferris Barracks	Erlangen	closed	1994	
Feucht Army Airfield	Nuremberg	closed	1992	
Finthen Army Airfield	Mainz	closed	1992	
Fiori Kaserne	Aschaffenburg	closed	1992	
Fischbach Army Depot	Fischbach bei Dahn	closed	1992	
Flak Kaserne	Augsburg	closed	1990s	
Flak-Kaserne Ludwigsburg	Ludwigsburg	closed	1991	
Flensburg Supply Depot	Flensburg			
Fliegerhorst Airfield Kaserne	Hanau	closed	2007	
Flint Kaserne	Bad Tölz	closed	1991	7^{th} NCO Academy
Ford Barracks	Ulm	transferred to Bundeswehr	c. 1960	
Fort Camp Redleg	Heilbronn	closed	1991	known as Waldheide, today
Fort Skelly	Regensburg	transferred to Bundeswehr	1965	
François Kaserne	Hanau	closed	1993	
Fryer Circle Housing Area	Augsburg	closed	1998	
Funari Barracks	Mannheim	closed	2012	except for an enclave, that closed in 2014
Gablingen Kaserne	Augsburg	closed	1998	
General Patton Hotel	Garmisch-Partenkirchen	closed	2009	
General Walker Hotel	Obersalzberg	closed	1995	
George C. Marshall Kaserne	Bad Kreuznach	closed	2001	
Gerszewski Barracks	Karlsruhe	closed	1995	
Gibbs Kaserne	Frankfurt	closed	1990s	
Giebelstadt Army Air Field	Giebelstadt	closed	2006	
Giessen Depot	Giessen	closed	2008	
Graves Kaserne	Aschaffenburg	closed	1992	
Grenadier Kaserne	Stuttgart			
Griesheim Army Airfield/Stars and Stripes Kaserne	Griesheim	closed	2008	Stars and Stripes moved to Kaiserslautern
Grossauheim Kaserne	Hanau	closed	2008	
Gruenewald Training Area	Berlin	closed	1994	
Gutleut Kaserne	Frankfurt	closed	1976	
Hahn Air Base	Hunsrück	closed	1993	
Hammonds Barracks	Mannheim	closed	2010	
Hardt Kaserne	Schwäbisch Gmünd	closed	1991	
Harris Barracks	Coburg	closed	1991	
Harvey Barracks	Kitzingen	closed	2007	
Hawkins Barracks	Oberammergau	transferred to Bundeswehr	1975	formerly, an Army Intelligence center; it was transferred to Bundeswehr as an administration school, in 1975. A NATO Special Weapons School still exists on the grounds.
Heidelberg Army Airfield	Heidelberg			
Helmstedt Support Detachment	Helmstedt	closed	1990	
Herzo Base	Herzogenaurach	closed	1992	
Hessen Homberg Kaserne	Hanau	closed	1990s	
Hindenburg Kaserne	Ansbach	closed	1992	
Hindenburg Kaserne	Würzburg	closed	1994	torn down
Holbeinring Military Housing	Heidelberg	closed	2013	
Hospital Kaserne	Bad Kreuznach	closed	2001	
Hutier Kaserne	Hanau	closed	2008	
Jaeger Kaserne	Aschaffenburg	closed	1992	
JAROC Processing Compound	Berlin	closed	1994	
Jensen Kaserne	Munich	transferred to Bundeswehr	1957	
Johnson Barracks	Fürth	closed	1992	
Katterbach Kaserne	Ansbach			
Kelley Barracks/Nathan Hale Depot	Darmstadt	closed	2009	the Kelley Barracks part closed in 2009, Nathan Hale Depot was still active for a while, now closed
Kennedy Kaserne	Frankfurt	closed	1994	
Kilbourne Kaserne	Schwetzingen	closed	2012	closed in May 2012
Kimbro Kaserne	Murnau am Staffelsee	transferred to Bundeswehr	1960s	
Kingsley Kaserne	Hof	transferred to Bundeswehr	1972	USAFSS, before 1972 transfer
Krabbenloch Kaserne	Ludwigsburg	closed	1993	
Kreuzberg Kaserne	Zweibrücken	closed	1993	
Larson Barracks	Kitzingen	closed	2007	
Ledward Barracks	Schweinfurt	closed	2014	
Lee Barracks	Mainz	closed	1992	
Leighton Barracks	Würzburg	closed	2008	
Liliencron-Kaserne	Kellinghusen	closed	2009	last US soldiers left in 1992
Lincoln Village Housing Area	Darmstadt	closed	2009	
Lucius D. Clay Compound	Berlin	closed	1994	named for Lucius D. Clay
Lucius D. Clay Kaserne	Osterholz-Scharmbeck-Garlstedt	closed	1993	
Ludendorff Kaserne	Kornwestheim	closed	1993	
Mainz Army Depot	Mainz	closed	1993	
Mansfield Barracks	Feldkirchen	transferred to Bundeswehr	1965	
Mark Twain Village	Heidelberg	closed	2013	
Marshall Heights Housing Area	Kitzingen	closed	2007	
Maurice Rose Army Airfield	Frankfurt			
McGraw Kaserne	Munich	closed	1992	Chiemgau Complex, Perlacherforst Housing Area
McKee Barracks	Crailsheim	closed	1993	
McNair Barracks	Berlin	closed	1994	
McNair Kaserne	Höchst, Frankfurt	closed	1994	
McPheeters Kaserne	Bad Hersfeld	closed	1993	US 3^{rd} Army 14^{th} Squadron/11^{th} Armored Cav
Merrell Barracks	Nuremberg	closed	1992	
Michael Barracks	Höchst, Frankfurt	closed	1994	
Minick Kaserne	Bad Kreuznach	closed	1995	
Monteith Barracks	Fürth	closed	1993	
Muna Installation	Bamberg	closed	2008	
Münster Kaserne/Münster-Dieburg Special Weapons Depot	Münster-Dieburg	closed	1995	
Mutlangen MSA	Mutlangen	closed	1991	
Nachrichten Kaserne/130^{th} Station Hospital	Heidelberg	closed	2013	
Nellingen Barracks/Nellingen Kaserne	Ostfildern	closed	1992	
Nelson Kaserne	Neu-Ulm	closed	1991	
Neubiberg Air Base "Airfield R-85 Camp Rattle"	Neubiberg	transferred to Bundeswehr	1950s	now University of the Bundeswehr Munich
Neureut Kaserne	Karlsruhe			
North Point Kaserne		transferred to Bundeswehr	1996	(aka Kriegsfeld)
O'Brien Barracks	Schwabach	closed	1993	
Patrick Henry Village	Heidelberg	closed	2013	
Patton Barracks	Heidelberg	closed	2013	
Pattonville	Ludwigsburg-Remseck	closed	1993	
Paul Revere Village	Karlsruhe	closed	1995	was U.S. Army Housing Area, now Nordstadt
Peden Barracks	Wertheim am Main	closed	1992	
Pendleton Barracks	Giessen	closed	2007	
Peterson Kaserne	Munich	transferred to Bundeswehr	1960s	
Pforzheim Kaserne	Pforzheim	closed	1985	
Phillips Barracks	Karlsruhe			
Pinder Barracks	Zirndorf	closed	1995	
Pinder Kaserne	Landshut	transferred to Bundeswehr	1965	
Pioneer Kaserne	Hanau	closed	2008	
Pionier Kaserne	Aschaffenburg	closed	1992	
Pionier Kaserne	Regensburg	transferred to Bundeswehr	1980s	
Pond Barracks	Amberg	closed	1995	
Prinz Heinrich Kaserne	Lenggries	transferred to Bundeswehr	1960s	
Prinz Leopold Kaserne	Munich	closed	1955	
QM Area	Augsburg	closed	1998	
Ray Barracks	Friedberg	closed	2007	
Ready Kaserne	Aschaffenburg	closed	1992	
Reese Barracks	Augsburg	closed	1994	
Rhein Kaserne	Biebrich (Wiesbaden)	closed	1974	
Rheinland Kaserne	Ettlingen	closed	1995	
Rivers Barracks	Giessen	closed	1992	
Roman Way Village Housing Area	Butzbach	closed	2007	
Roosevelt Barracks	Berlin	closed	1992	
Rose Barracks	Bad Kreuznach	closed	2001	
Rothwesten Kaserne	Kassel	closed	1969	
Rottershausen Storage Area	Schweinfurt	closed	2014	
Schlangenbader Housing Area	Berlin	closed	1994	
Schleißheim Army Airfield	Oberschleißheim	transferred to Bundeswehr	1973	
Schloss Kaserne	Butzbach	closed	1992	torn down
Schwabstadl Kaserne	Klosterlechfeld	closed	1993	74^{th} USAFAD. Demolished in 2013
Sheridan Kaserne	Augsburg	closed	1998	
Sickels Army Airfield	Fulda	closed	1993	
Siegelsbach Army Depot	Siegelsbach	closed	1991	
Smiley Barracks	Karlsruhe			
Smith Kaserne	Aschaffenburg	closed	1992	
Spinelli Barracks	Mannheim	closed	2013	
Stanggass Kaserne				housing and H.Q. A.F.R.C. Berchtesgaden Military Community
Stars and Stripes Compound	Berlin	closed	1994	
Stars and Stripes	Griesheim	closed	2008	
St. Barbara Housing Area	Darmstadt			
Stetten Kaserne	Munich	transferred to Bundeswehr	1950s	
Strassburg Barracks	Idar-Oberstein	closed	2008	
Strub Kaserne/Gebirgsjäger Kaserne	Berchtesgaden/Strub	closed	1995	commissary, health clinic, A.F.R.C. Housing Berchtesgaden
Sullivan Barracks	Mannheim	closed	2013	
Sundgauer Housing Area	Berlin	closed	1994	
Taukkunen Barracks	Worms	closed	1996	
Taylor Barracks	Mannheim	closed	2010	
Teufelsberg Station	Berlin	closed	1994	
Thomas Jefferson Village	Worms	closed	1999	
Tompkins Barracks	Schwetzingen	closed		
Truman Plaza	Berlin	closed	1994	
Turley Barracks	Mannheim	closed	2007	
Turner Barracks	Berlin	closed	1992	
Underwood Kaserne	Hanau	closed	2008	
U.S. Army Hospital Berlin	Berlin	closed	1994	
U.S. Army Hospital Nürnberg	Nürnberg	closed	1994	
Valdez Barracks	Ludwigsburg	closed	1991	
Vimy Kaserne	Freising	transferred to Bundeswehr	1960s	
Virginia Depot	Munich	closed	1966	
Wallace Barracks	Stuttgart	closed	1993	
Warner Barracks	Bamberg	closed	2014	
Warner Kaserne	Munich	transferred to Bundeswehr	1968	now known as Ernst-von-Bergmann-Kaserne
Wharton Barracks	Heilbronn	closed	1989	named for James Edward Wharton
Wildflecken Kaserne	Wildflecken	transferred to Bundeswehr		
Wiley Barracks	Neu-Ulm	closed	1991	
Wilkins Kaserne	Ludwigsburg			
Will Kaserne	Munich	transferred to Bundeswehr	1968	now known as Fürst-Wrede-Kaserne
W.O. Darby Kaserne	Fürth	closed	1995	
Wolfgang Kaserne	Hanau	closed	2008	
Würzburg Hospital	Würzburg	closed	2008	
Yorkhof Kaserne	Hanau	closed	2008	
Yorktown Housing Complex	Schweinfurt	closed	2014	
