= Allied Command Europe Mobile Force =

NATO quick reaction force at Heidelberg, Germany, active from 1960 to 2002

Coordinates: 49°23′11.93″N 8°40′55.08″E

Allied Command Europe Mobile Forces
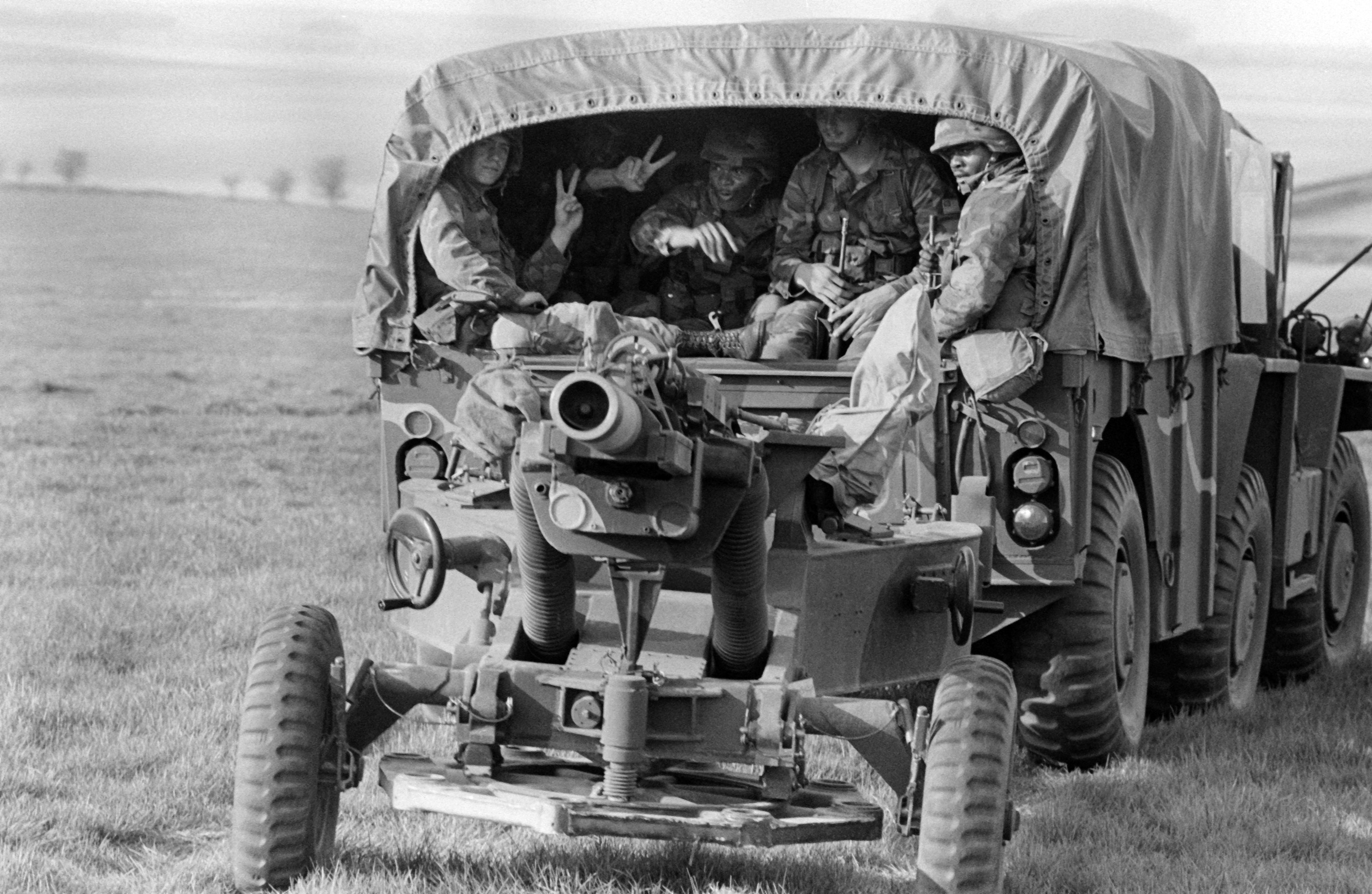
- U.S. soldiers wave from the back of a Gama Goat towing a howitzer from a drop zone during NATO Exercise Ardent Ground '87 on 24 April 1987.
- Active: 1960 – 30 October 2002
- Country: NATO
- Role: Quick Reaction Force
- Part of: Allied Command Europe
- Headquarters: Campbell Barracks, Heidelberg

The Allied Command Europe Mobile Force (AMF) was a small NATO quick reaction force, headquartered at Heidelberg, Germany, active from 1960 to 2002. It formed part of Allied Command Europe (ACE), headquartered at SHAPE at Casteau, Belgium. The land component of the force, consisting of a brigade-sized formation of about 5,000 personnel, was composed of units from 14 NATO states.

HQ CO US AMF(L) Infantry was at Coleman Barracks, Mannheim, GE 95-02, HQ AMF (L) was at Sullivan Barracks, Mannheim, 1975–1991 and Turley Barracks, Mannheim, 1991–1995.

== ACE Mobile Force (Land) ==
The ACE Mobile Force-Land or AMF(L) was intended as a multinational force that could be quickly despatched to any part of ACE's command area - from North Norway, to Germany, to eastern Turkey - to demonstrate the solidarity of the alliance and its ability to resist all forms of aggression against any member state. During the Cold War the AMF-L did frequent exercises in North Norway and in other areas. The Bundeswehr responded to the request of NATO from December 9, 1960, from January 1961 to provide a paratrooper battalion, a medical company, an airborne telecommunications company, and air transport units.

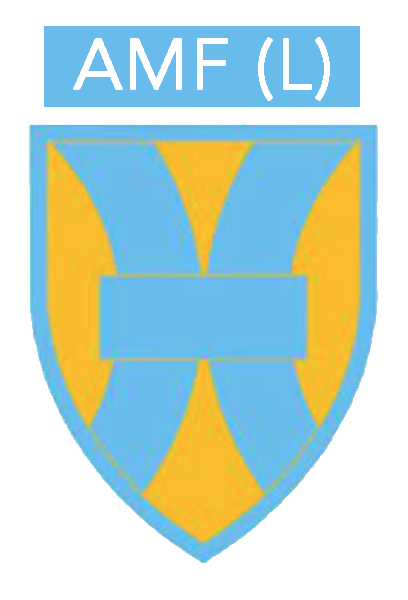
Allied Mobile Forces (Land) SSI 1960-2002

In October 1961 Bundeswehr units, including parts of the 1st Airborne Division (the Parachute Battalion 262) in the AMF in October 1961 in Sardinia during Exercise First Try in part, on the Belgian, British and American soldiers were also involved. In November 1965, the Parachute Battalion 262 took part in the AMF maneuver Eastern Express II on the southeast flank of NATO, which took place in Turkey under the leadership of the AMF commander Major General Michael Fitzalan-Howard (UK). In total, 3,500 soldiers from the US, UK, Belgium, Germany and Italy participated in the maneuvers. In 1967 the maneuver Sunshine Express in Greece, also with German participation.

In 1970 at Narvik in northern Norway on the north flank of NATO, the AMF United maneuver Arctic Express with 4000 soldiers.

It was first deployed operationally in 1991 during the Gulf War, when part of its air component was dispatched to watch the Turkish borders, in the face of a potential threat to a member's territory.

The AMF(L) was one of the NATO formations deployed to Norway during Exercise Strong Resolve 1998.

The AMF(L) formed the core of the Albania Force (AFOR), a NATO-led international force responsible for establishing and delivering humanitarian aid to refugees from Kosovo in Albania during the Kosovo crisis in 1999. It was led by Major General John Reith, Commander AMF(L).

The Immediate Reaction Task Force (Land) (IRTF-L) was a novel command and control concept successfully developed and evaluated by the AMF(L) between 1999 and 2001. The IRTF(L) concept allowed the AMF(L), an existing Immediate Reaction Force multinational brigade HQ, to command a divisional sized force with minimal augmentation and no intermediate HQs. The trial concluded in December 2001.

The Telegraph wrote in 2002 that NATO had to disband the ACE Mobile Force, '..after Britain withdrew its contribution to ensure troops were available to join any US attack on Iraq. Britain's contribution to [the force] included key support troops, without which the 6,000-strong force could not operate. With no other NATO member prepared to contribute more soldiers, the alliance had no choice but to disband it.'

HQ AMF(L) was disbanded on October 31, 2002, and has since been replaced by the NATO Response Force.

== Exercises ==
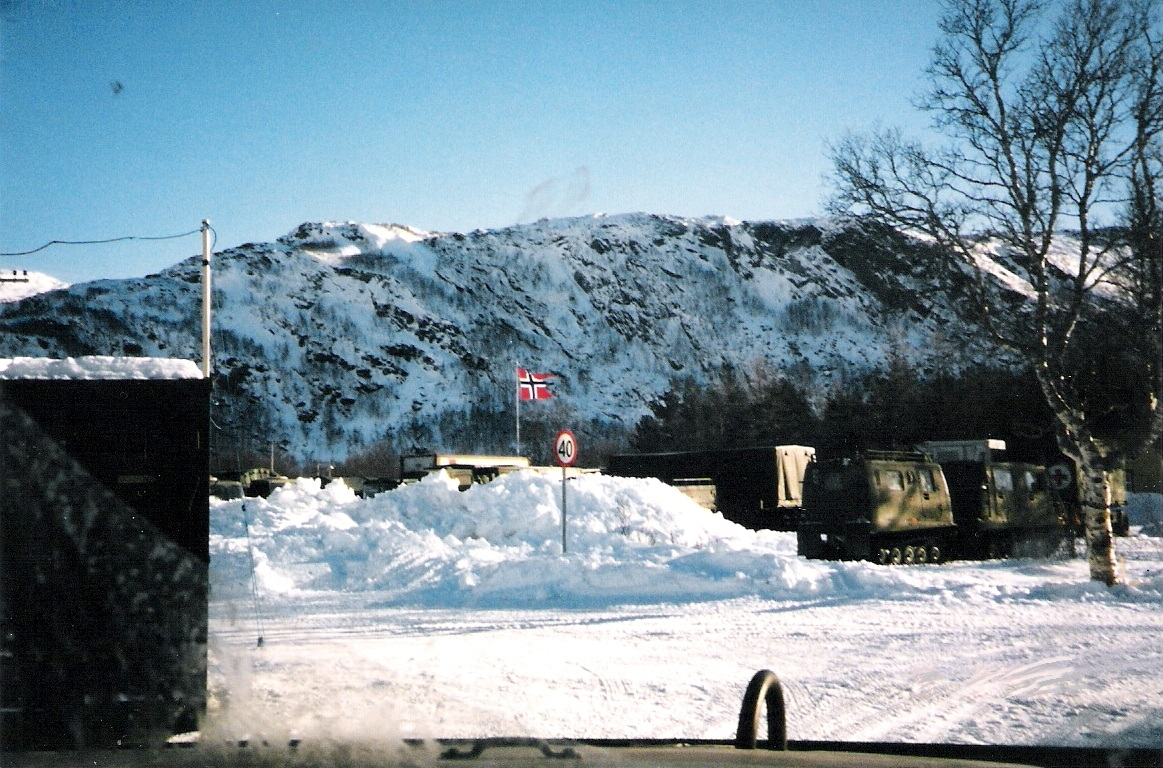
Part of the NATO maneuver Strong Resolve (1998)

The ACE Mobile Force took part in a large number of exercises.

- 1961 First Try, Sardinia
- 1962 Southern Express, Greece
- 1963 Finnmark, Norway
- 1963 Summer Marmara Express, Greece
- 1965 Eastern Express, Turkey
- 1966 Summer Marmara Express, Greece and Turkey
- 1967 Sunshine Express, Greece
- 1968 Greece
- 1969 Olympic Express, Turkey
- 1970 Deep Express, Turkey
- 1970 Arctic Express, Narvik, Norway
- 1971 Hellenic Express, Greece
- 1972 Canadian Club, Germany
- 1973 Absalom Express Denmark
- 1975 Deep Express, Turkey
- 1975 Advent Express, Great Britain
- 1976 Halina Express, Great Britain
- 1977 Schwarzer Husar, Great Britain
- 1980 Anorak Express, Norway
- 1980 Ardent Ground, Great Britain
- 1981 Amber Express, Denmark
- 1981 Ardent Ground, Portugal
- 1982 Ardent Ground, Portugal
- 1983 Ardent Ground, Belgium
- 1984 Avalanche Express, Norway
- 1984 Ardent Ground, Great Britain
- 1985 Archway Encounter,Turkey
- 1985 Albatross Exchange, Denmark
- 1986 Ardent Ground, Belgium
- 1987 Ardent Ground, Great Britain. Members of the Allied Command Europe Mobile Force from Belgium, the Netherlands, West Germany, Italy, Luxembourg, the United Kingdom and the United States participated in the live artillery/air exercise ARDENT GROUND '87 at Salisbury Plain Training Area in Wiltshire.
- 1987 Accord Express, Denmark
- 1987 Aurora Express, Turkey
- 1988 Arrowhead Express, Norway
- 1988 Alley Express, Turkey
- 1989 Ardent Ground, Italy
- 1989 Armanda Exchange, Pavia di Udine and Paularo, Italy
- 1989 Action Express, Denmark
- 1990 Array Encounter 90, Norway
- 1991 Alley Express, Denmark
- 1992 Ardent Ground, Otterburn, Northumberland, Great Britain
- 1992 Alley Express, Turkey
- 1993 Arena Exchange, Puglia, Italy
- 1993 Action Express, Denmark
- 1993 Ardent Ground, Belgium
- 1994 Arctic Express, Bardudoss, Norway
- 1994 Ardent Ground, Baumholder, Germany
- 1994 Arrow Exchange, Gaziantep, Turkey
- 1995 Strong Resolve, Trondheim, Norway
- 1995 Arctic Express, Norway
- 1996 Cooperative Adventure Express, Belgium
- 1997 Adventure Express, Norway
- 1997 Ardent Ground, Turkey
- 1998 Cooperative Adventure Exchange, Slovenia
- 1998 Strong Resolve, Norway
- 1998 Strong Resolve, Portugal
- 1999 Adventure Exchange, Italy
- 2000 Joint Winter, Norway
- 2000 Ardent Ground, Hungary
- 2000 Adventure Exchange, Greece
- 2001 Adventure Exchange, Turkey
- 2002 Cooperative Adventure Exchange, Ukraine

== Commanders ==
- Major General Michael Fitzalan-Howard United Kingdom 1964-1966
- Lieutenant General Giles A. Turcot Canada 1967-January 1969
- Major General Alberto Li Gobbi Italy 1969-1972
- Major General Andrw G. Christie Canada 1983-1986
- Major General John G. Reith United Kingdom 1997-2000
