= Friedrich Josef Rauch =

- Born: 1906; Munich, Bavaria, German Empire
- Died: Unconfirmed Unconfirmed
- Allegiance: Nazi Germany
- Branch: Reichskanzlei
- Service years: 1933–1945
- Rank: Obersturmbannführer (Lieutenant Colonel)

Friedrich Josef Rauch was an SS Obersturmbannführer (Lieutenant Colonel) in charge of the Führer's personal security at the Reichskanzlei (Reich Chancellery) after 1942 and was alleged to be involved in the disposal of Nazi gold in 1945.

== Life ==
Friedrich Josef Rauch was born in Munich in 1906, the son of a senior police inspector. At the age of 15, whilst still at school, he joined a right wing paramilitary Freikorps unit and in 1922 joined the NSDAP. He was involved in the attempted Nazi Beer Hall Putsch and in 1923 was one of the first recipients of the Blutorden award (Blood Order). He later joined the SA and gained employment in the Bavarian police. His career was accelerated by the Nazi assumption of power in 1933.

Friedrich Rauch was six feet tall and an experienced horse rider, skier, and mountaineer. He held political and nationalistic views aligned with the New Order. He was promoted to inspector, then to captain in the Security Police. In 1940, he was seconded to Berlin for security duties on the staff of the Head of the Reich Chancellery, Dr. Lammers.

In 1940 he was admitted into the Allgemeine SS with rank as an SS Hauptsturmführer. In December that year he volunteered to leave the office and served in the 1st SS Division Leibstandarte SS Adolf Hitler, seeing action in Bulgaria, Greece, Romania and Yugoslavia. In July 1941 Rauch returned to work under SS Obergruppenführer Dr. Hans Lammers in Berlin.

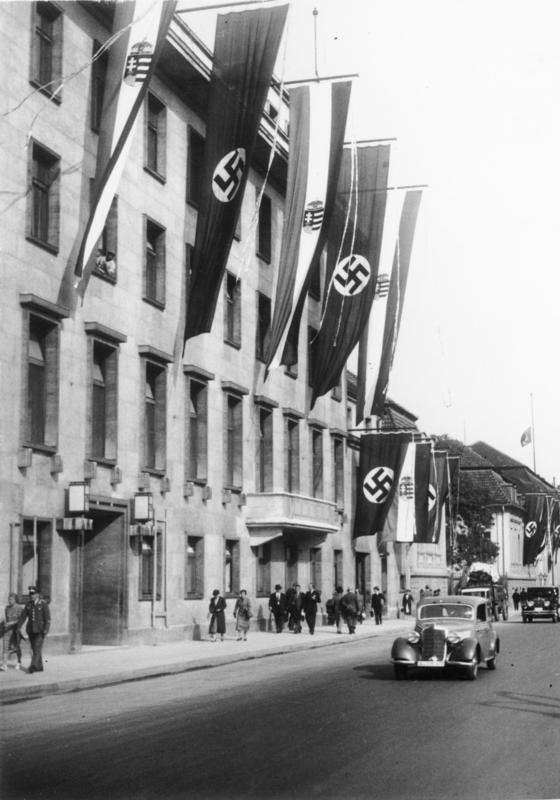
The annex of the Old Reich Chancellery, August 1938

Early in 1942 Rauch was appointed SS Sturmbannführer of the Schutzpolizei (Major in the Security Police) and by Spring 1944 he was promoted to SS Obersturmbannführer (Lieutenant Colonel). This promotion was ratified and signed by both Hitler and Himmler.

On 9 April 1945, with the Red Army rapidly approaching, Dr Lammers persuaded Hitler to relocate the Reichsbank gold bullion, currency reserves and other wealth, to a safer location in southern Germany. Rauch was posted to ensure security. On 14 April, when the Reichsbank loot was transported on trains, Rauch flew down to the Berchtesgaden, where he obtained papers discharging him from further service. Over 21–22 April Rauch escorted the treasure to the Kaserne (barracks) of the Wehrmacht Gebirgsjägerschule (mountain troops school) in Mittenwald, Bavaria. Rauch left the gold with a Wehrmacht Colonel named Franz Pfeiffer with vague instructions to protect it from foreign armies.

SS Obersturmbannführer Rauch surrendered to US troops in June 1945 but was soon released under curious circumstances after helping US military personnel locate much of the loot, which was never properly processed to the appropriate US military financial authorities. According to SHAEF regulations, Rauch should have been automatically arrested due to his SS rank, but he was not interned until 27 November when a special Counter Intelligence Corps agent seized and interrogated him at Tegernsee city jail. Rauch was then, inexplicably, transferred to a Civilian Enclosure at Stephanskirchen and released the following year.

In February 1948 Rauch and his wife emigrated to Argentina with the direct help of the Croatian Roman Catholic priest Krunoslav Draganović, where he became José Federico Rauch. Rauch soon "became a partner in a metallurgical firm by the name of Exact SCL, a company formed by Germans and based at Santa Rosa" in Buenos Aires. Curiously Franz Pfeiffer later emigrated also to Argentina and is understood to have joined the company board of directors.

Rauch returned to Europe and settled in Austria at the early 1970s where he died in the 1990s.

== Dates of rank ==
SS Hauptsturmführer : 1940

SS Sturmbannführer : 1942

SS Obersturmbannführer : 1944

== Literature ==
- Ian Sayer & Douglas Botting, Nazi Gold (Granada Publishing, 1984)
- Höhne, Heinz. Der Orden unter dem Totenkopf, (English translation entitled The Order of the Death's Head, The Story of Hitler's SS) London: Pan Books Ltd. (1969)
- Koehl, Robert Lewis. The Black Corps University of Wisconsin Press, (1983)
- Reitlinger, Gerald. The SS: Alibi of a Nation 1922-1945. Viking (Da Capo reprint), New York (1957). ISBN 0-306-80351-8
- Shirer, William L.. The Rise and Fall of the Third Reich, Gramercy (1960). ISBN 0-517-10294-3
- SS Officer Personnel Files, National Archives and Records Administration, College Park, Maryland
- History of the Counter Intelligence Corps: vol. XXV, Occupation of Austria and Italy (Fort Holabird, Baltimore, 1959).
- Kenneth A. Alford & Theodore P. Savas, Nazi Millionaires: The Allied Search for Hidden SS Gold (Casemate; 2002) ISBN 0-9711709-6-7
- Uki Goni, The Real Odessa: Smuggling the Nazis to Peron's Argentina (Granta Books, 2002) ISBN 1-86207-581-6
- SS-Obersturmbannführer and Lieutenant Colonel of the Schutzpolizei Fritz Rauch. Settlement of a trivial dispute with First Lieutenant Gerhard Conrad with the involvement of the commanding admiral of the submarines of Friedeburg. https://invenio.bundesarchiv.de/invenio/direktlink/73fb444a-6f00-419f-8092-ce4d9fc45133/
