= BFV =

BFV may refer to:

== Football ==
=== Football associations ===
- Baden Football Association, the Badischer Fussball-Verband, a regional football association in Germany
- Bavarian Football Association, the Bayerischer Fussball-Verband, a regional football association in Germany
- Berlin Football Association, the Berliner Fussball-Verband, a regional football association in Germany
- Bremen Football Association, the Bremer Fußball-Verband, a regional football association in Germany
- Burgenland Football Association, the Burgenländischer Fussballverband, a regional football association in Austria

=== Football clubs ===
- BFV Hassia Bingen, a German football club
- FC BFV, a football club in Madagascar

== Other ==
- Bradley Fighting Vehicle, a United States family of armored fighting vehicles
- Benjamin Franklin Village, a United States Army installation in Germany
- Federal Office for the Protection of the Constitution, or Bundesamt für Verfassungsschutz, the German domestic intelligence agency
- Buriram Airport, an airport in Thailand (IATA airport code: BFV)
- Braxton Family Values, an American reality TV series
