= 1st Mountain Division =

1st Mountain Division may refer to:

- 1st Mountain Division (Wehrmacht)
- 1st Mountain Division (Bundeswehr)

== See also ==
- 1st Division (disambiguation)
