= 91st Cavalry Regiment =

91st Cavalry Regiment (Airborne)
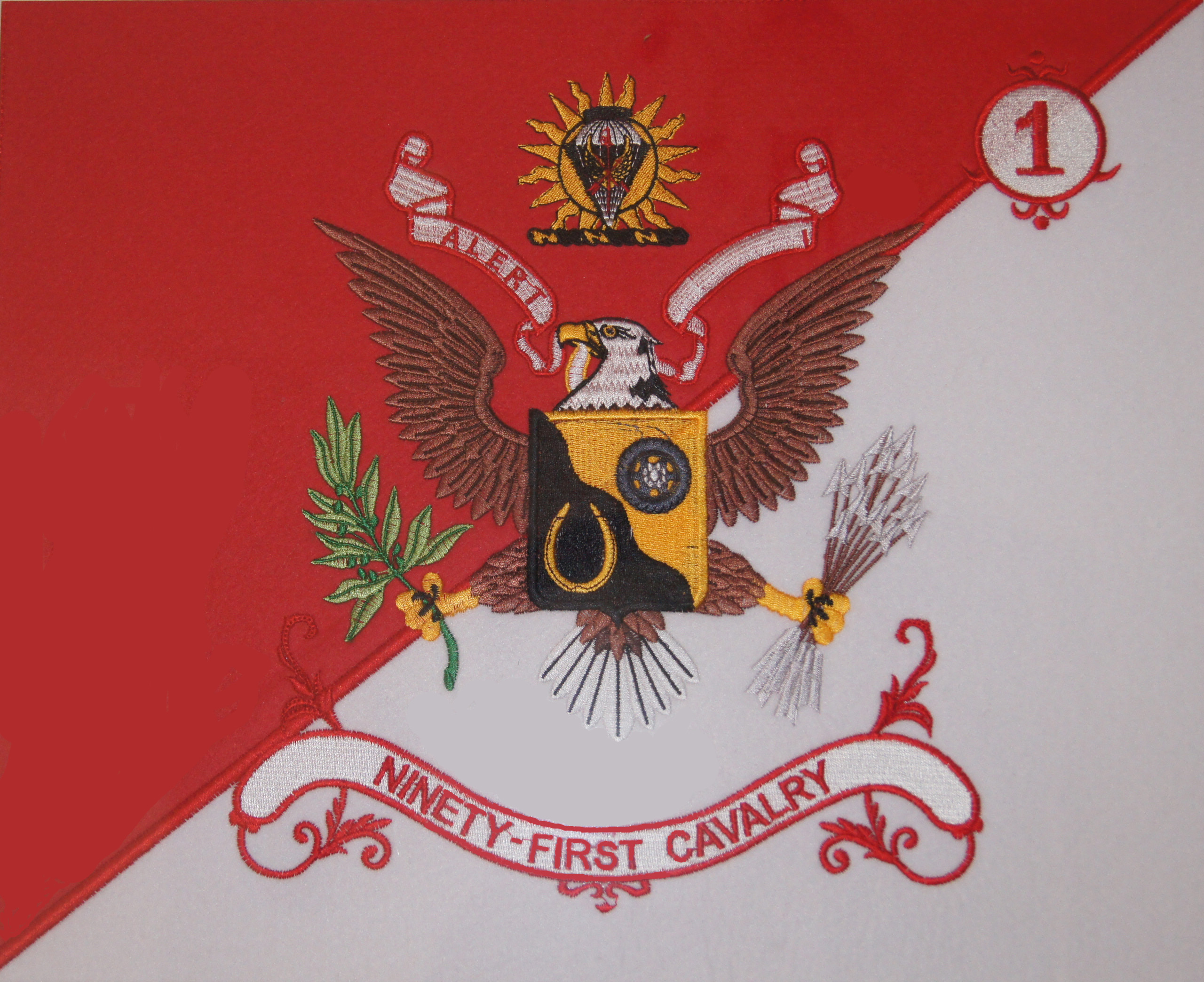
- 1st Squadron Colors
- Active: 1928–1945; 1950; 1953; 2006–2026
- Country: United States
- Branch: United States Army
- Type: Light Airborne Reconnaissance
- Role: Reconnaissance, Surveillance and Targeting Acquisition
- Part of: 173rd Airborne Brigade Combat Team
- Garrison/HQ: Tower Barracks; Grafenwöhr, Germany
- Nickname: "The Airborne Cav"
- Motto: "Alert"
- Engagements: World War II; Operation Enduring Freedom Operation Atlantic Sentry Operation Atlantic Resolve
- Decorations: Presidential Unit Commendation Award 1944 Joint Meritorious Unit Award (Anvil Troop - 2017) Valorous Unit Award Meritorious Unit Commendation x 3 Superior Unit Award (Anvil Troop - 2017)

Commanders
- Current commander: LTC Austin Commons
- Notable commanders: CPT Harold G. Holt; MAJ John C. MacDonald; COL Eugene A. Regnier; LTC Harry W. Candler; LTC Charles A. Ellis; LTC Hyman Bruss; LTC Christopher Kolenda; LTC Paul W. Fellinger; LTC Whit Wright; LTC Ari M. Martyn

Insignia
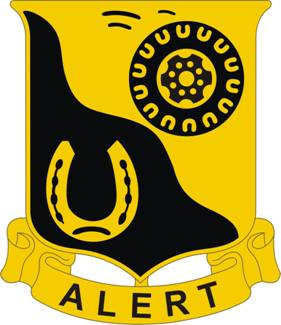
- Distinctive unit insignia

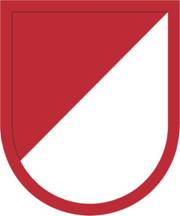
- Beret flash

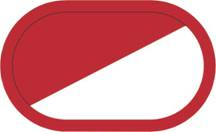
- Airborne background trimming

The 1st Squadron, 91st Cavalry Regiment (Airborne) was a light Airborne Reconnaissance Squadron that served as the 173rd Airborne Brigade's reconnaissance, surveillance, and target acquisition (RSTA) squadron based out of Tower Barracks in Grafenwöhr, Germany. It is the only Airborne RSTA Squadron within the European, Middle East, and Africa (EMEA) area of responsibility. It was reflagged to 3rd Battalion, 504th Infantry Regiment on 8 January 2026.

The 91st Cavalry Reconnaissance Squadron was originally organized as a mechanized cavalry reconnaissance squadron in the 1st Cavalry Division. It was the oldest and most experienced squadron (battalion) sized mechanized reconnaissance unit in the US Army. It completed six campaigns in North Africa, Sicily, and Italy during World War II, while attached to various infantry and armored divisions. The 91st Cavalry Recon Squadron was a non-divisional unit and reported directly to the Army's II Corps. The unit was deactivated on 23 June 1953.

The 91st Reconnaissance Squadron was re-activated, re-organized, and re-designated the 1st Squadron (Airborne), 91st Cavalry Regiment on 8 June 2006, at Conn Barracks in Schweinfurt, Germany. This reactivation was part of the transition of the 173rd Airborne Brigade to the U.S. Army's new modular force structure. This reactivation was the first time the colors of the 1st Squadron (Airborne), 91st Cavalry Regiment had flown since the end of World War II.

Organized as ″Task Force Saber″, 1-91 CAV has subsequently deployed three times to the International Security Assistance Force's (ISAF) Regional Command East in Eastern Afghanistan during Operation Enduring Freedom (OEF). During OEF VIII 2007-08, the Squadron deployed troops to Nuristan, Kunar, Nangarhar, and Paktika Provinces. During OEF X from 2009–10, and OEF XII-XIII from 2012–13, the Squadron deployed to Logar Province.

Soon after returning to Germany from OEF XIII in March 2013, 1-91 CAV moved from Conn Barracks in Schweinfurt to Tower Barracks in Grafenwöhr due to a Brigade realignment and the imminent closure of USAG Schweinfurt. After moving to Tower Barracks, 1-91 CAV shifted focus from the OEF mission to Airborne proficiency, and NATO support and tactical reassurance.

Since 2013, 1-91 CAV has conducted operations in Poland, the Czech Republic, Italy, France, Lithuania, Latvia, Estonia, Romania, Ukraine, Bulgaria, and Israel in addition to its German home. Most notably, 1-91 CAV represented the United States in several internationally recognized NATO exercises to include: Operation Steadfast Jazz, Operation Atlantic Resolve, Operation Allied Spirit, Operation Swift Response, Operation Agile Spirit, and Operation Saber Junction.

Most recently in January 2017 and again in June 2021, a detachment consisting primarily of members of the dismounted reconnaissance Troops (1-91 CAV), deployed to conduct security force operations in support of the Global War On Terror for Operation Atlantic Sentry.

In September 2020, 1-91 CAV conducted an airborne operation into Vaziani, Georgia. The Squadron returned again in July 2021 for Operation Agile Spirit, conducting two more airborne operations onto Vaziani DZ. This time the unit jumped with Georgian Jumpmasters, making 1-91 CAV the first unit ever to earn Georgian Jump Wings.

In August 2021, 1-91 CAV deployed to Ramstein Air Base, where they spent two months supporting Operation Allies Refuge, contributing to the housing and transportation of roughly 40,000 Afghan refugees. The Squadron was awarded the Humanitarian Service Medal and the Army Superior Unit Award for its efforts during this period.

In January 2022, and again in January 2023, the UAS Platoon from Headquarters and Headquarters Troop deployed to Leon, Spain for a month each time to conduct joint training with the Spanish Army.

Members of Anvil Troop participated in and won the Gainey Cup - Best Scout Squad Competition at Fort Benning in May 2025 ahead of 17 other teams from the United States, the Netherlands, Great Britain, Canada, Germany, and Ireland.

== Lineage ==
The 91st Cavalry Regiment was constituted in the Regular Army on 16 October 1928 from the 1st Armored Car Troop as Troop A of the 1st Armored Car Squadron, and assigned to the 1st Cavalry Division. Troop A was transferred to Fort George G. Meade, Maryland, on 29 August 1928, to Fort Holabird, Maryland, on 1 October 1928, and to Fort Bliss, Texas, on 10 November 1928. The remainder of the squadron was assigned to the Eighth Corps Area, and was activated on 30 June 1932 at Fort Bliss, Texas, with Organized Reserve personnel as a Regular Army Inactive (RAI) unit. On 1 March 1939, the squadron was redesignated the 1st Reconnaissance Squadron. On 3 January 1941, the squadron was fully activated and all Reserve personnel were relieved of assignment. It was redesignated the 91st Reconnaissance Squadron on 8 May 1941.

- 91st Reconnaissance Battalion (1950)
- 91st Armored Cavalry Reconnaissance Battalion (1953)
- 1st Squadron, 91st Cavalry Regiment (Airborne) (2006 – 2026)

== Honors ==
=== Medal of Honor Recipients ===
- 1LT Gerry H. Kisters - 31 July 1943, Nicosia, Gagliano, Italy

(From Citation) "...On 31 July 1943, near Gagliano, Sicily, a detachment of one officer and nine enlisted men, including Sergeant Kisters, advancing ahead of the leading elements of U.S. troops to fill a large crater in the only available vehicle route through Gagliano, was taken under fire by two enemy machineguns. Sergeant Kisters and the officer, unaided and in the face of intense small arms fire, advanced on the nearest machinegun emplacement and succeeded in capturing the gun and its crew of four. Although the greater part of the remaining small arms fire was now directed on the captured machinegun position, Sergeant Kisters voluntarily advanced alone toward the second gun emplacement. While creeping forward, he was struck five times by enemy bullets, receiving wounds in both legs and his right arm. Despite the wounds, he continued to advance on the enemy, and captured the second machinegun after killing three of its crew and forcing the fourth member to flee."

- 1LT Gerry H. Kisters was the first serviceman to be awarded both the Congressional Medal of Honor and the Distinguished Service Cross during World War II.

=== Distinguished Service Cross Recipients ===
- 1LT Gerry H. Kisters - 7 May 1943, Ferryville, Tunisia

(From Citation) "...In May 1943, Ferryville, Tunisia, Sergeant Kisters made several individual reconnaissance missions, returning each time with timely and valuable information concerning location of artillery emplacements. Alone, and while subjected to enemy heavy artillery and concentrated machine gun fire, and individual rifle fire, Sergeant Kisters crept forward on an artillery piece which was firing on our forces. By the effective use of his hand grenades and rifle fire, Sergeant Kisters wiped out the entire crew."

- SGT Peter T. Perkins - 3 Aug 1943, Sicily, Italy

"...Sergeant Peter T. Perkins (ASN: 18009273), United States Army, was awarded the Distinguished Service Cross (Posthumously) for extraordinary heroism in connection with military operations against an armed enemy while serving with the 91st Reconnaissance Squadron, in action against enemy forces on 27 July 1943. Sergeant Perkins' intrepid actions, personal bravery and zealous devotion to duty at the cost of his life, exemplify the highest traditions of the military forces of the United States and reflect great credit upon himself, his unit, and the United States Army."

- LTC Charles A. Ellis - 2–3 July 1944, Serrazzone, Fonano, Italy

"...The President of the United States takes pleasure in presenting the Distinguished Service Cross to Charles A. Ellis, Lieutenant Colonel (Cavalry), U.S. Army, for extraordinary heroism in connection with military operations against an armed enemy in action against enemy forces on 2 and 3 July 1944. Lieutenant Colonel Ellis' intrepid actions, personal bravery and zealous devotion to duty exemplify the highest traditions of the military forces of the United States and reflect great credit upon himself, his unit, and the

- MAJ Thomas Bostick - B 1/91 CAV; 27 July 2007; Nuristan, Afghanistan

The President of the United States of America, authorized by Act of Congress July 9, 1918, takes pride in presenting the Distinguished Service Cross (Posthumously) to Major (Infantry) Thomas Gordon Bostick, United States Army, for extraordinary heroism while engaged in an action against an enemy of the United States while serving as the Commanding Officer of Troop B, 1st Squadron, 91st Cavalry Regiment, 173d Airborne Brigade, on 27 July 2007 in Afghanistan. When he was advised by friendly foreign forces that an enemy element was approaching his position, Major Bostic rapidly employed mortar fire and close air support on the approaching enemy to suppress them. While directing fire, his position came under enemy small arms fire, nevertheless, he continued to direct fire until the enemy was defeated. When the immediate threat was neutralized, Major Bostic maneuvered his quick reaction force to a forward position to retrieve three casualties. After a lull in the battle, the enemy reinforced their attack and engaged Major Bostick and the forward elements from three sides. Once again, he employed direct and indirect fire on the enemy positions and enabled the lead element to begin to move to more defensible positions. As the fire on his position intensified, Major Bostick positioned himself between the enemy and his own exposed Soldiers who were navigating the mountainous terrain and engaged the enemy with accurate fire. While in this exposed position and under continuous small arms and rocket propelled grenade fire, he was mortally wounded. Major Bostick's selfless actions ensured his Soldiers had sufficient time to retreat through the hazardous terrain in order to seek cover and survive the attack. Major Bostick's actions are in keeping with the highest traditions of the military service and reflect great credit upon himself, the 91st Cavalry Regiment, and the United States Army.

=== Silver Star Recipients ===
- PVT Carl Moore; B 91st RECON; 3 Aug 1943; Sicily, Italy
- SGT Joseph A. Mammone, 91st CAV RECON, 1944, Sicily, Italy
- CPT Simmie Oslin Callahan III, 91st CAV RECON; 1943
- MAJ John B. Donnell, 91st CAV RECON, Bizerte, Tunesia, Africa, 1943
- 1LT Dan E. Coffee, 91st CAV RECON, Bizerte, Tunesia, Africa, 1943
- 1LT John M. Davis, B TRP, 91st CAV RECON, Africa, 1943
- 1LT John P. Starrs, 91st CAV RECON, Sicily, Italy, 21 May 1944
- 2LT William R. White, 91st CAV RECON, Sedjenane, Africa, 27 Apr 1943
- 1LT Charles W. Stowell, E TRP, 91st CAV RECON, Africa, 1943
- CPT Ted F. Douthitt, C TRP, 91st CAV RECON, Africa, 1943
- 1LT Edward Stuart Wells, A TRP, 91st CAV RECON, Africa, 1943
- 1LT Charles W. Stowell, E TRP, 91st CAV RECON, 1944
- 1LT John Meyer; B 1/91 CAV; 27 July 2007; Nuristan, Afghanistan
- 1LT Alex Newsom; B 1/91 CAV; 27 July 2007; Nuristan, Afghanistan
- SGT Robert Fortner; B 1/91 CAV; 27 July 2007; Nuristan, Afghanistan

== World War II Configuration ==
91st Cavalry Reconnaissance Squadron (1941–1943)

- Headquarters Troop
- A Troop (Recon, Scout Car)
- B Troop (Recon, Scout Car)
- C Troop (Recon, Bantam)
- E Troop (Light Tank)

91st Cavalry Reconnaissance Squadron (1943–1945)

- Headquarters Troop, with Pioneer and Demolitions Platoon
- A Troop (Recon, Scout Car)
- B Troop (Recon, Scout Car)
- C Troop (Recon, Bantam)
- D Troop (Support Troop)
- E Troop (Anti-Tank)
- F Troop (Heavy Guns)

== Most recent configuration ==
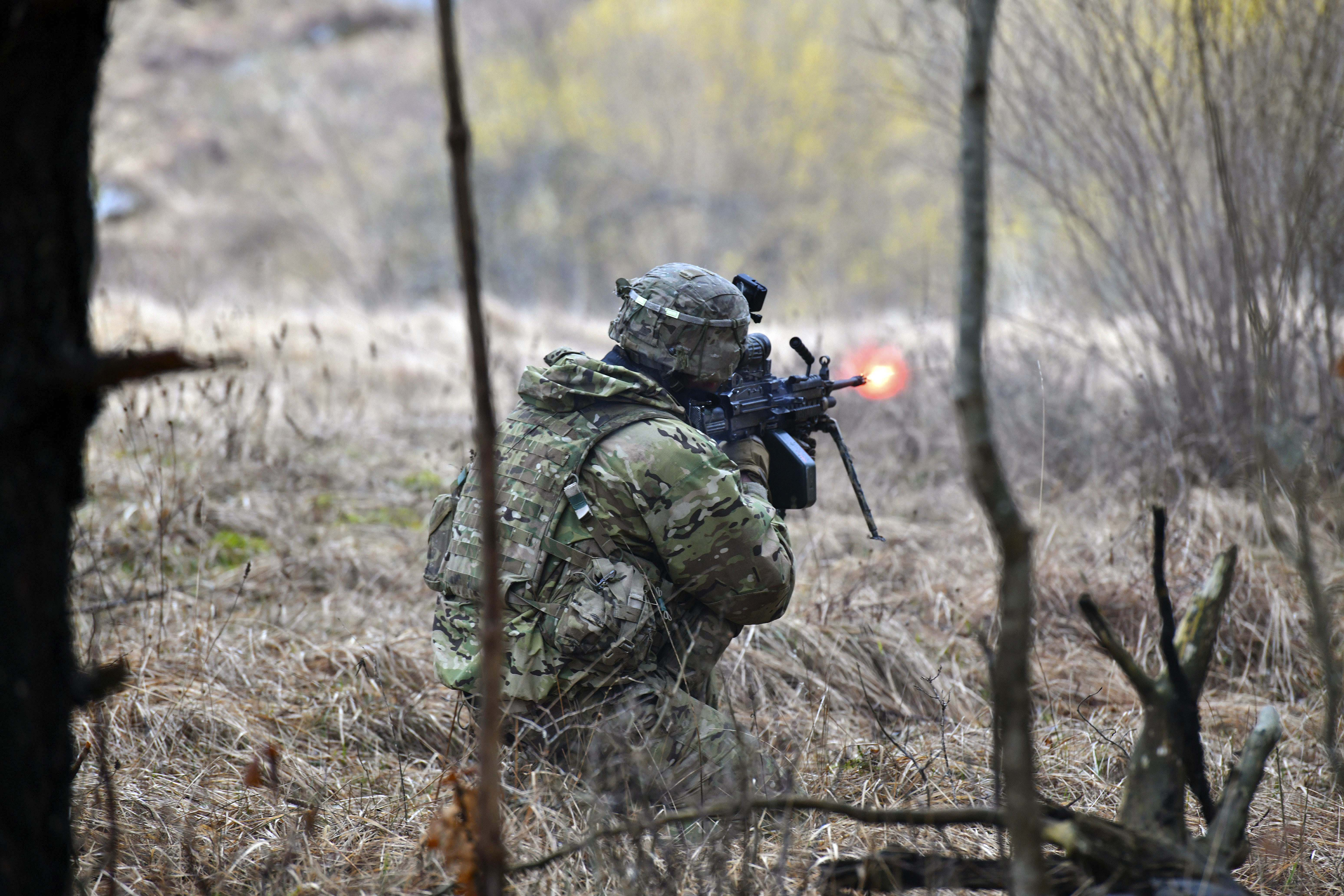
A paratrooper assigned to 1st Squadron engaging targets during a live-fire exercise during Eagle Sokol 21.

Prior to inactivation in early 2026, 1st Squadron, 91st Cavalry Regiment (Airborne) was constituted with five troops:

- Headquarters and Headquarters (Hellcat) Troop (Command Group, Medical Platoon, FIST, TUAS Platoon)
- Anvil Troop (mounted reconnaissance troop)
- Bulldog Troop (mounted reconnaissance troop)
- Comanche Troop (dismounted reconnaissance troop)
- Darkhorse Troop (forward support troop)

== See also ==
- United States Army branch insignia
- List of armored and cavalry regiments of the United States Army
- Cavalry (United States)
