= Bayern-Kaserne =

Coordinates: 48°12′0″N 11°35′41″E

names
founding name	General-Wever-Kaserne (Nazi use)
1945 to 1969	Henry Kaserne (U.S. use)
current name	Bayern-Kaserne (Bundeswehr use)

The Bayern-Kaserne (literally Bavaria-Barracks) is a military facility in Munich, Germany, originally named General-Wever-Kaserne. The facility was constructed between 1936 and 1938. After World War II it was renamed by the United States forces to Henry Kaserne in honor of Private Robert T. Henry. When it was transferred to the German Bundeswehr, it was renamed once more in honor of General Walther Wever on 9 October 1969.

== History ==
Before the Americans acquired the barracks in 1945, they were used by Flak units of the Wehrmacht.

In 1953 an armoured battalion of the US 5th Infantry Division was assigned here.

In 1956 the units of the US Army's 11th Airborne Division replaced the 5th Infantry Division and were stationed here. They were the 76th Tank Battalion and 127th Airborne Engineers. The 76th Tank Bn was composed of A, B, C and D companies, and a Headquarters Co. Across the street (Ingolstädter Landstrasse) was stationed the 503rd Airborne Infantry Regiment of the 11th Airborne Division. The battalion was equipped with M48 tanks and did its training in Grafenwehr and Vilseck training areas. Since the battalion was Airborne, Nuebiberg was the LZ, with the DZ located just north of the barracks area (near where the Allianz Arena is today - 2012). The Battalion Commander was Lt. Col. Carlton Preer. The battalion was inactivated in 1958, when the 11th Airborne was inactivated. The personnel and equipment were reassigned to the 24th Infantry Division.

When the American troops left the barracks, the Bundeswehr acquired them in 1969. Until the 1990s they were used by the following units:

- subordinated units of the former Wehrbereichskommando VI (Military District Command VI; today IV):
  - staff, 1st and 3rd company of the Feldjäger Battalions 760 (FJgBtl 760) until 1993
  - Fernmeldekompanie 760 (FmKp 760; signal company)
  - Nachschubkompanie 760 (NschKp 760; supply company)
  - Instandsetzungskompanie 760 (InstKp 760; maintenance company)
  - Ausbildungskompanie Stabsdienst / Militärkraftfahrer 852 (AusbKp StDst/MKF 852; training company for staff service soldiers and military drivers)
- subordinated units of the former Heimatschutzbrigade 56 (Homeland Security Brigade 56)
  - Panzergrenadierbataillon 561 (PzGrenBtl 561)
  - Panzerartilleriebataillon 565 (PzArtBtl 565; armored artillery battalion)
  - Nachschubkompanie 560 (NschKp 560; supply company)
  - Instandsetzungskompanie 560 (InstKp 560; maintenance company)

Another former user was the Fachausbildungskompanie Munich (FachAusbKp MCH), a company for professional training, which was stationed in the barracks until 1992.

In 1994 the Wehrbereichskommando VI / 1. Gebirgsdivision (WBK IV/1. GebDiv) moved into the Bayern-Kaserne. The WBK IV/1. GebDiv was disposed after the unification of the 1st Mountain Division with the former Wehrbereichskommando VI. It was renamed to Wehrbereichskommando IV - Süddeutschland in 2001.

Other current users have been the Landeskommando Bayern (LKdoBY; Land Command Bavaria), the catholic and the Protestant military deanery, and the local Bundeswehr school Bundeswehrfachschule-/Zivile Aus- und Weiterbildungsbetreuungsstelle B München (BwFachS-/ZAW-BeSt B MCH) for professional training with civilian recognition, which has been the follow-on institution of the former Ausbildungskompanie Fach-/Fachschulausbildung Munich since 2006.

In late 2007 the facility was sold by the g.e.b.b. to the city of Munich. The Bundeswehr units have to leave the area by 2011. Before the barracks were sold, some parts were rented.

== See also ==
- List of barracks in Munich
