= Robert T. Henry =

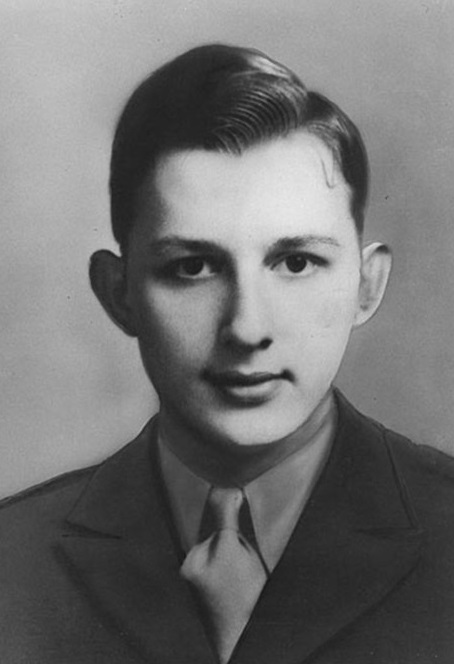
- Born: November 27, 1923; Greenville, Mississippi, U.S.
- Died: December 3, 1944 (aged 21); Luchem, Germany
- Burial place: Greenville Cemetery Greenville, Mississippi
- Military career
- Allegiance: United States
- Branch: United States Army
- Service years: 1943–1944
- Rank: Private
- Units: 16th Infantry Regiment, 1st Infantry Division
- Conflicts: World War II
- Awards: Medal of Honor

Robert T. Henry (November 27, 1923 – December 3, 1944) was a United States Army soldier and a recipient of the United States military's highest decoration—the Medal of Honor—for his actions in World War II.

== Biography ==
Henry joined the Army from his birthplace of Greenville, Mississippi in April 1943, and by December 3, 1944, was serving as a private in the 16th Infantry Regiment, 1st Infantry Division. On that day, at Luchem, Germany, he single-handedly charged a German machine gun nest which was preventing the advance of his platoon. Although he was killed before reaching the nest, his attack provided a distraction which enabled his comrades to destroy the position. For this action, he was posthumously awarded the Medal of Honor six months later, on June 12, 1945.

Henry, aged 21 at his death, was buried at Greenville Cemetery in his hometown of Greenville, Mississippi. The Henry Kaserne in Munich was named in his honor.

== Medal of Honor citation ==
Private Henry's Medal of Honor citation reads:

Near Luchem, Germany, he volunteered to attempt the destruction of a nest of 5 enemy machineguns located in a bunker 150 yards to the flank which had stopped the advance of his platoon. Stripping off his pack, overshoes, helmet, and overcoat, he sprinted alone with his rifle and hand grenades across the open terrain toward the enemy emplacement. Before he had gone half the distance he was hit by a burst of machinegun fire. Dropping his rifle, he continued to stagger forward until he fell mortally wounded only 10 yards from the enemy emplacement. His single-handed attack forced the enemy to leave the machineguns. During this break in hostile fire the platoon moved forward and overran the position. Pvt. Henry, by his gallantry and intrepidity and utter disregard for his own life, enabled his company to reach its objective, capturing this key defense and 70 German prisoners.

== See also ==
- List of Medal of Honor recipients
- List of Medal of Honor recipients for World War II
