= Ayers Kaserne =

U.S. Army installation in Germany

Ayers Kaserne at Kirch-Göns, Germany (coordinates: 50° 28' 46.08" N 8° 38' 41.83" E) was a U.S. Army installation built in 1952 as part of the major construction efforts under the U.S. Army troop augmentation program of the early 1950s, occupied by the 22nd Regimental Combat Team of the Fourth infantry Division until May, 1956, and by the Third U.S. Armored Division in 1956 and then home to Combat Command A, 3rd Armored Division was stationed at Ayers Kaserne beginning 12 May 1956. The troops arrived following an 11-hour train ride from the port of Bremerhaven.

== History ==
Ayers Kaserne was known as The Rock in the United States European Command (EUCOM); on 1 October 1963, Combat Command A was reorganized and re-designated as the 1st Brigade, 3rd Armored Division (United States), then the largest combat brigade in Europe ’til 1996, when the Division colors were repatriated to Ft. Knox, Kentucky for retirement of the colors, which concluded the history of the Spearhead 3rd Armored Division.

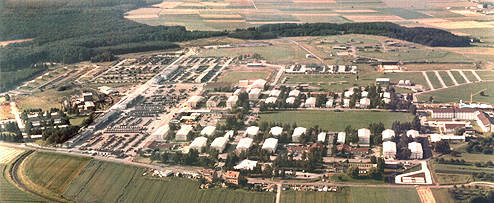
Ayers Kaserne, 1985. Note Motorpools with tanks, APCs and artillery

President Gerald R. Ford visited Ayers Kaserne in July 1975; the first visit by a U.S. President to a European U.S. military installation since Pres. Kennedy's visit to the 3rd Armored Division in Hanau, Germany, in 1963. President Ford was accompanied by General Alexander M. Haig, Jr. (the seventh Supreme Allied Commander, Europe), Colonel Louis C. Wagner, Jr. (Commander, 1st Brigade, 3AD); and Georg Leber (German Minister of Defense).

Units of the 1st Armored Division (forward) occupied the kaserne until its closing and return to the German government in 1998.

Today, the former military kaserne has been redeveloped as a business/industrial park, chiefly occupied by a transport company named "Bork". All post buildings have been demolished except for the former chapel.

The kaserne was named Ayers Kaserne in honor of SSG Lovall E. Ayers, B Company, 22nd Infantry Regiment, 4th Infantry Division, killed in action in World War II.

== See also ==
- Kaserne
- List of United States Army installations in Germany
