= Benjamin Franklin Village =

United States Army installation in Germany

Coordinates: 49.5176°N 8.5312°E

Benjamin Franklin Village, also called BFV, was a United States Army installation in Mannheim-Käfertal, Germany. It opened in 1947 after World War II and was named after Benjamin Franklin. It was closed as part of the restructuring of US forces in Europe. The last soldier and his family moved out in September 2012.

The Mannheim military community was composed of several posts within a relatively small area in and around Mannheim. Sullivan Barracks, Taylor Barracks, and Funari Barracks, Benjamin Franklin Village housing and the military shopping area were all located within walking distance of one another.

The approximate total population in Mannheim assigned prior to closure was 15,000 which consists of: Army active duty, 4,000; Air Force active duty, 200; Army family members, 6,484; Air Force family members, 197; civilian employees and family members, 3,266 and US military retirees, 727. The closure of Mannheim and Heidelberg Kasernes is estimated to save the US $112,000,000 per year in operational costs starting in 2016.

== Redevelopment ==
Benjamin Franklin Village and the other Army Kasernes in Mannheim are scheduled to be returned to the German government after the US removes all of its property from the site. Planning for redevelopment of the real estate is already ongoing. Parts of the buildings were used to host some hundred asylum seekers and refugees starting September 2015.

== See also ==
- List of United States Army installations in Germany
