= 1st Mountain Division (Bundeswehr) =

Coordinates: 48°12′00″N 11°35′41″E

- 1st Mountain Division insignia
- Active: 14 November 1956 – 30 September 2001
- Country: West Germany (1956-1990); Germany (1990-2001)
- Branch: Army
- Type: Gebirgsjäger
- Role: Mountain warfare
- Size: Division
- Part of: German II Corps
- Garrison/HQ: Garmisch-Partenkirchen(1956-1994); Bayern-Kaserne(1994-2001)
- March: Kaiserjäger

Insignia
- Identification symbol: Edelweiss

The 1st Mountain Division (1. Gebirgsdivision) was a West German mountain infantry formation. It was part of the II Corps of the Bundeswehr. In the wake of military restructuring brought about by the end of the Cold War, the 1st Mountain Division was disbanded on 30 September 2001.

The division was constituted in November 1956 as part of the II Corps of the Bundeswehr. As initially formed, it had two brigade-sized battle-groups, "A8" and "B8" (despite its numerical designation, the division was considered the eighth division of the Bundeswehr). In 1959, the battle-groups were retitled the 22nd and 23rd Mountain Brigades, and the division also took command over the 24th Panzer Brigade. In 1966, the 24th Panzer Brigade was transformed into the 24th Panzergrenadier Brigade. This structure remained stable until 1981, when the 24th Brigade once again became a Panzer brigade and the 22nd Mountain Brigade was transformed into a Panzergrenadier brigade, leaving only a third of the division's troops as mountain infantry. The 56th Local Defense Brigade was also subordinated to the division. Division headquarters was located at Garmisch-Partenkirchen.

In 1989, division equipment included Bo-105 helicopters, Leopard I tanks, Gepard SP anti-aircraft guns, Fliegerfaust 1 ManPADS, M110 203mm SP howitzers, M109G 155mm SP howitzers, LARS and MARS multiple rocket launch systems, Jaguar SP ATGMs, and Marder IFVs.

With the end of the Cold War, the 22nd Panzergrenadier Brigade was disbanded in 1992. This was followed by the inactivation of the 24th Panzer Brigade in 1994. The division was then merged with Military Readiness Command VI with the 23rd Mountain Brigade, 36th Panzer Brigade, and the 60th Engineer Training Brigade as subordinated components. In 1994 the Wehrbereichskommando VI / 1. Gebirgsdivision (WBK IV/1. GebDiv) headquarters moved into Bayern-Kaserne, Munich.

After 1993, elements of the division saw international service in Somalia, Macedonia, Albania, Kosovo, and Bosnia.

== Commanders ==
Nr.	Name	Start of command	End of command
15	Generalmajor Kersten Lahl	2000	2001
14	Generalmajor Dieter Henninger	1998	2000
13	Generalmajor Rainer Jung	1995	1998
12	Generalmajor Franz Werner	1990	1995
11	Generalmajor Jürgen Schlüter	1986	1990
10	Generalmajor Horst Netzler	1983	1986
9	Generalmajor Eberhard Hackensellner	1980	1983
8	Generalmajor Michael Greipl	1975	1980
7	Generalmajor Ernst Metz	1972	1975
6	Generalmajor Rainer Schwartz	1971	1971
5	Generalmajor Joachim Horbach	1967	1971
4	Generalmajor Karl Wilhelm Thilo	1965	1967
3	Generalmajor Karl-Heinz Wirsing	1962	1965
2	Generalmajor Georg Gartmayr	1959	1962
1	Brigadegeneral Hans Buchner	1956	1959
