= Virginia-Depot (Munich) =

Coordinates: 48.196°N 11.560°E

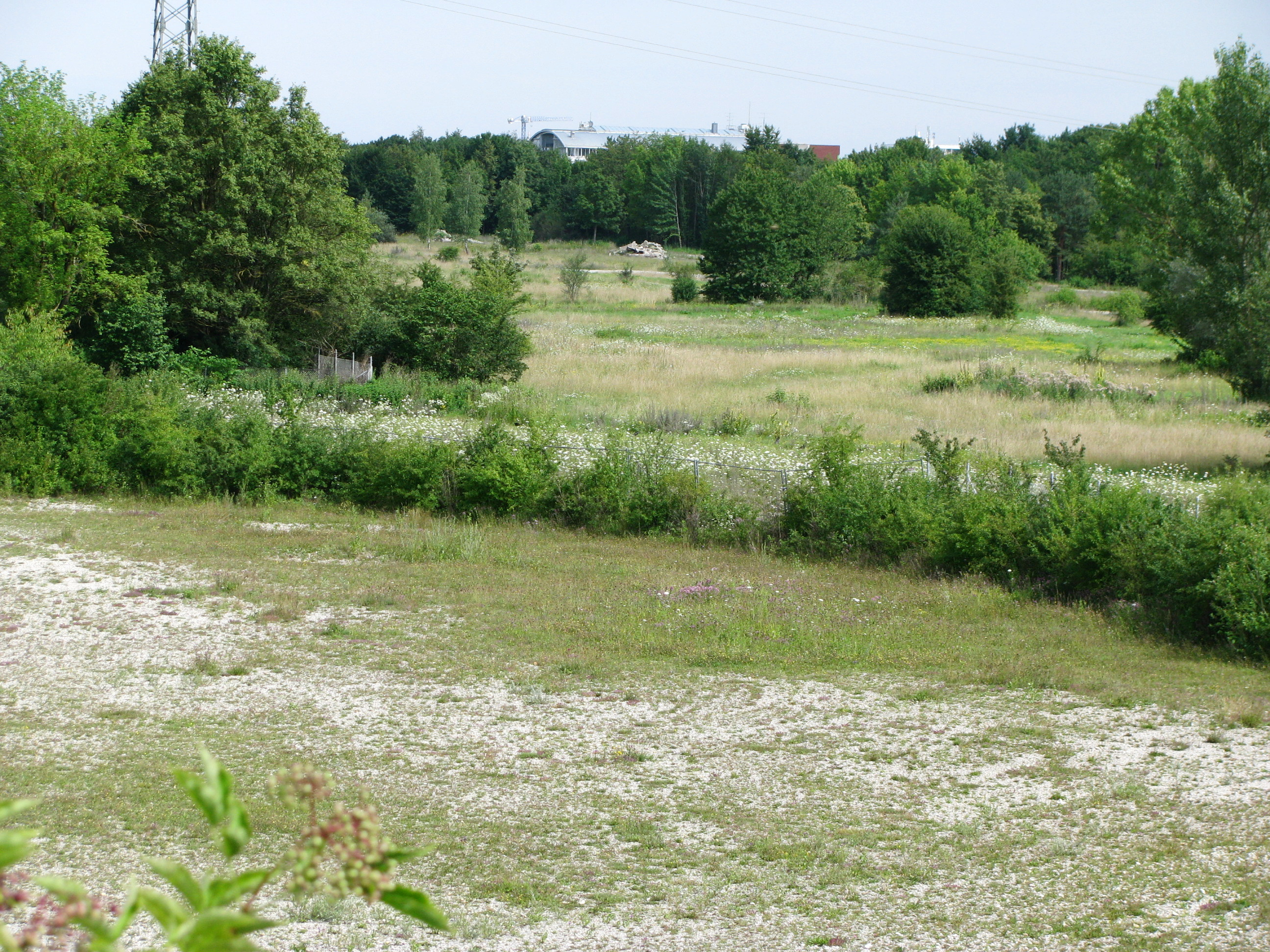

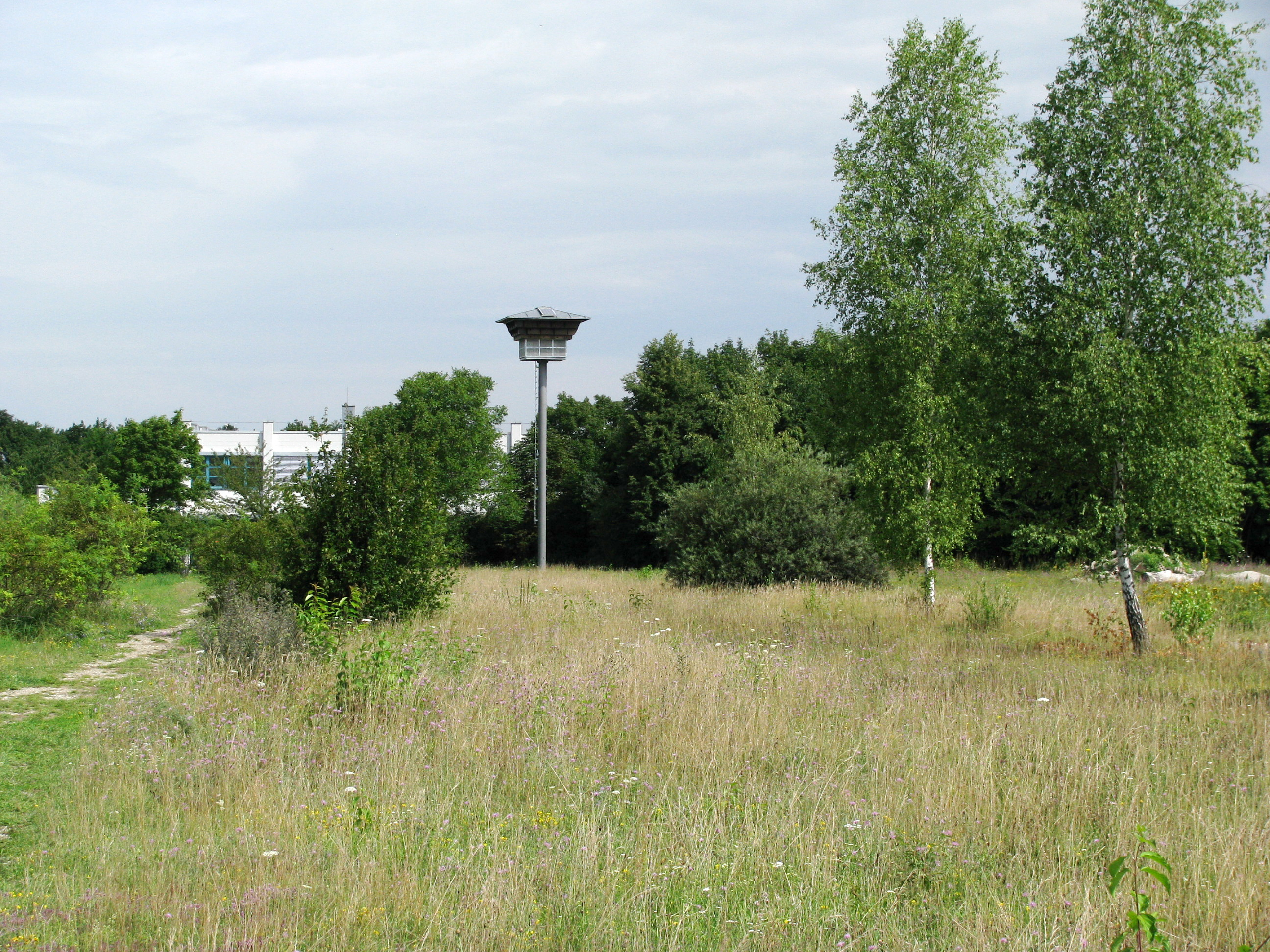
Virginia biotope with gross tower for kestrels, swifts and jackdaws

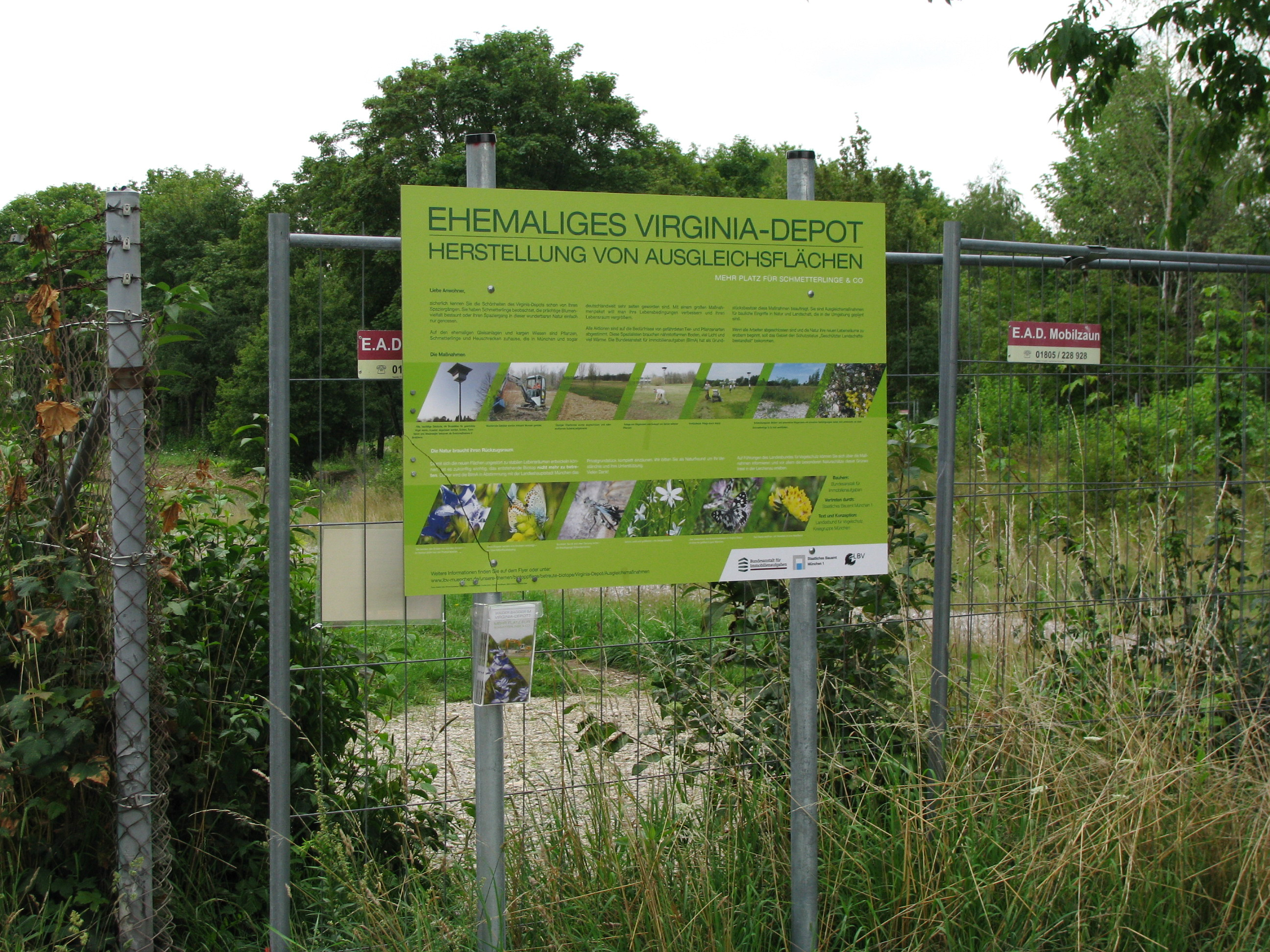
Information board

The Virginia depot was a military camp used last by the Bundeswehr west of Schleißheimer Straße in the Munich district of Lerchenau. Today it is a biotope with rare plant species.

== History ==
In the years between 1936 and 1940, in addition to other buildings, seven warehouses designed as bunkers with a total of about 133,000 m³ of enclosed space were erected. They belonged to the Army Catering Main Office in Munich. In 1945 the area was taken over by the United States Army. They set up the Virginia Area Storage Facility there, named after the US state of Virginia. In 1957 the US-American facility dissipated and the name Virginia-Depot was retained. During the subsequent use by the Bundeswehr, the Military District Clothing Office VI and the Munich branch of the Military District Catering Office VI were located there. Heavy equipment from neighbouring barracks were also loaded over the tracks of the Bundeswehr tank loading station at the powder tower. The Bundeswehr abandoned the site around the mid-1990s. The buildings were demolished around 2011. Today, only the loading ramp of the former railway connection to Munich North Ring is visible on the site.

The former Virginia depot is located at the bus stop "Pulverturm" of bus line 178. In the northeastern corner of the area is the local association München-Mitte of the Technische Hilfswerk. To the east is the site of the former Kronprinz-Rupprecht-Kaserne, which is connected to the former Virginia depot by a bridge across Schleißheimer Straße.
