= Faulenberg Kaserne =

- Faulenberg Kaserne (Germany)

Site information
- Type: Military Garrison
- Condition: Closed

Location
- Coordinates: 49°47′49″N 009°58′01″E

Site history
- In use: 1877–2007

Garrison information
- Occupants: German Empire (1877-1918); Weimar Republic (1918-1933); Nazi Germany (1933-1945); United States (1945-2007)

Faulenberg Kaserne was a former military garrison, located near Grombühl, east of the City of Würzburg, in Franconia, Germany. The kaserne (English: barracks), built in the region of the former Faulenberg vineyard (Heffner, 1979), was bordered on the south by Nürnberger Straße, on the west by Matthias-Thoma-Straße and on the north on the outer Aumühlstraße and Kürnach. To the east is Ohmstraße. It was active as a military base between 1877 and 2007.

== History ==
The garrison was constructed from 1876 to 1879 as the Neue Artilleriekaserne (English: New Artillery Barracks), located along Faulenbergstraße (now Nürnberger Straße) near the Würzburg-Bamberg rail lines. It was named after the Faulenberg vineyard, near where it was built. From 1879 until the dissolution of Bavarian Army in 1919, this barracks was home to the Königlich Bayerisches 2. Feldartillerie-Regiment Horn (English: Royal Bavarian 2nd Field Artillery Regiment "Horn") (Thelemann, 1924). After the First World War, the barracks were used until 1939 by the police and later by machine gun troops and communications units of the Wehrmacht. At the end of the Second World War it was occupied by the U.S. Army from 1945 until its closure in 2007. Its use during World War II is undetermined.
