= U.S. Army Garrison Schweinfurt =

U.S. Army installation in Schweinfurt, Germany

USAG Schweinfurt
- Schweinfurt, Germany
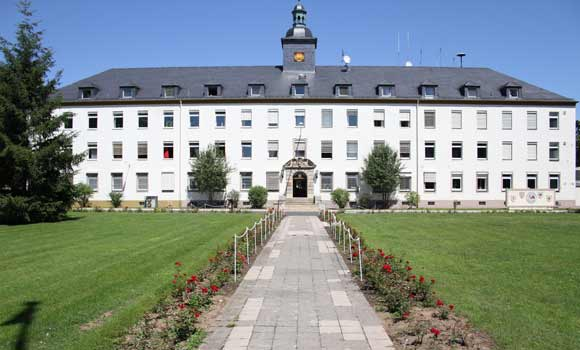
- USAG Schweinfurt Ledward Barracks HQ Building

Site information
- Type: Army Post
- Owner: German Institute for Federal Real Estate
- Operator: United States Army

Site history
- Built: 1935
- Built by: Heer & Luftwaffe
- In use: 1945–2014
- Fate: U.S. tenancy ended, returned to BImA

United States Army Garrison Schweinfurt (USAG Schweinfurt) was a United States Army military community located in and around Schweinfurt, Germany from 1945 to 2014. The garrison comprised two installations (Conn and Ledward Barracks), two housing areas (Askren Manor and Yorktown Village Housing Area), and two local training areas (Brönnhof or Area M) in Pfändhausen, to the north of Schweinfurt as well as Sulzheim (Sulzheim Training Area), 15 minutes to the south of Schweinfurt. Cold War-era installations in Bad Kissingen, Bad Neustadt, Hammelburg, and Oerlenbach were closed prior to the closure of USAG Schweinfurt in the years following German reunification in 1990.

== History ==
The installations that would go on to comprise Ledward and Conn Barracks of USAG Schweinfurt began construction in 1935. Ledward Barracks was then a Heer tank barracks, constructed from 1935–36 for Panzerregiment 4, then called the Schweinfurt Panzerkaserne or Adolf-Hitler-Kaserne, while Conn Barracks, originally known as Flugplatz Schweinfurt was constructed from 1936–37 as a Luftwaffe airfield, which was used to base Ju 87 Stuka bombers.

Troops from the 42nd Infantry Division, Seventh U.S. Army liberated the constituent installations and the city of Schweinfurt on April 11, 1945. Immediately following World War II, the Flugplatz was renamed Schweinfurt Air Base, and used by the Army Air Corps; the former Panzerkaserne was used as a refugee camp for displaced Estonians, Yugoslavs, Lithuanians, and Poles, while also containing U.S. consular offices.

On October 19, 1946, the Panzerkaserne was redesignated Ledward Barracks, in honor of Colonel William J. Ledward, Commander of the 27th Artillery Battalion, killed in action in Italy in 1944. On December 22, 1947, Schweinfurt Air Base was redesignated Conn Barracks, in honor of 2nd Lieutenant Orville B. Conn, Jr. of the 6th Cavalry Group, killed in action in France in 1944.

Under the United States Army, Schweinfurt was home to approximately 11,000 people at its peak, including about 6,000 Soldiers, family members, Department of Defense civilian employees, and their dependents. At the time of its closing, USAG Schweinfurt was subordinate to United States Army Installation Management Command – Europe and was an indirect report garrison under USAG Ansbach, as part of the Franconia Military Community.

The installation was returned to the German government on September 19, 2014 due to an ongoing effort to concentrate the U.S. military's footprint in Germany to fewer communities. Since the end of the Army's tenancy, the installation has been utilized by the German government for a variety of uses, including the housing of refugees from the European migrant crisis.
