= Taylor Barracks =

Military installation in Mannheim, Germany

Coordinates: 49.514045°N 8.552806°E

Taylor Barracks is a former military installation in the Vogelstang suburb of Mannheim, Germany, operated and administrated by the United States Army, Europe, USAREUR. In Dec 2010 USAREUR announced that the installation was handed back to the German government.

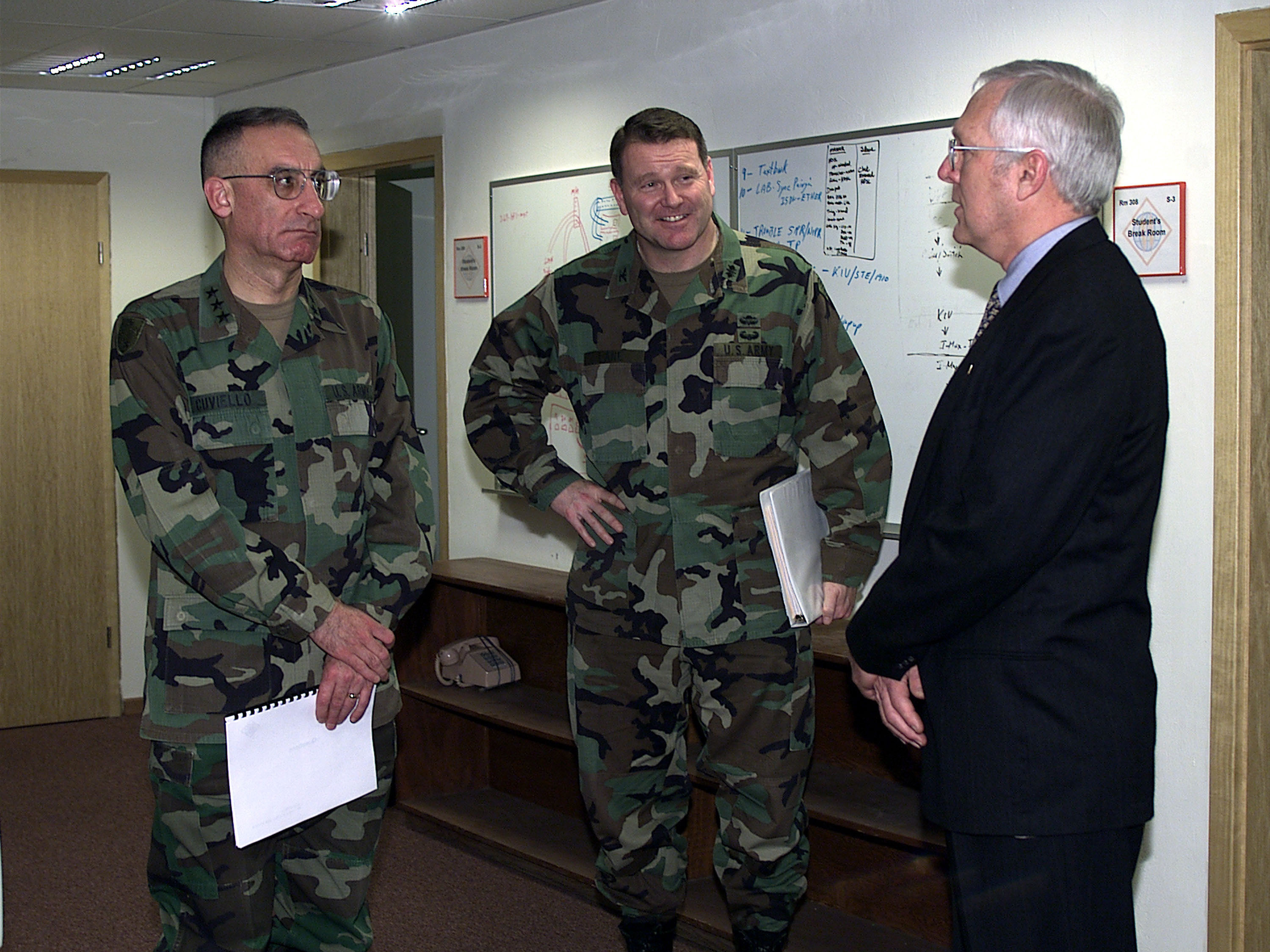
US Military officials meeting in Taylor Barracks, 2002

== History ==
The original Scheinwerfer-Kaserne (Searchlight Barracks) was constructed between 1939-40 as part of the Wehrmacht’s rapid expansion following the Nazi takeover. The unit stationed there during World War II was part of the Luftwaffe’s Flakscheinwerfer-Abteilung 299 (299th Anti-aircraft Searchlight Detachment) and the installation supported the various searchlight units posted around the city to protect it from bombing. The anti-aircraft artillery units were supported from Sullivan Barracks, then known as Flak-Kaserne, and home to 1st Bn, 49th AAA Reg. Anti-aircraft positions stretched from the Coleman Army Airfield (then known as Fliegerhorst Kaserne) where two batteries of heavy guns were positioned, around Käfertal to Wallstadt.

== American occupation ==
The American garrison has its roots with the American occupational forces immediately following World War II. In those days, Mannheim installations were administered by 2nd Military District (renamed Heidelberg Military Post in 1947, Headquarters Area Command in 1952 and in 1965 North Baden Area) that also managed Heidelberg, Worms and Karlsruhe posts.

The barracks was named after Pvt. 1st Class Cecil V. Taylor who posthumously received a Silver Star for courage in the face of the enemy. Taylor continued to fire his machinegun, though mortally wounded, fighting off an enemy counterattack in Beilstein, Germany, on 18 April 1945. Taylor was assigned to 399th Inf Reg, 100th Infantry Division.

In January 1948, the 547th and 584th Ordnance Companies were moved to Taylor Bks from Mannheim-Rheinau to operate Heidelberg Military Post Ordnance. In June, the companies were joined to form the 7859th Ordnance Company and over the years this unit was renamed many times becoming the current Maintenance Activity Mannheim.

In Dec 1949, 503rd Engineer Light Equipment Company moved from Berlin to Taylor Barracks. At Taylor Barracks they were involved in German-American friendship projects such as building sports fields etc.. As the Cold War became hotter, they were increasingly sent into the French occupation zone near Kaiserslautern to build various military facilities. One of these was then called Rhein Ammunition Depot, now called Rhine Ordnance Barracks. In 1950 the French zone roads and economy were lagging far behind the British and American zones. The escalation of the Cold War mandated the French zone roads be upgraded. An Autobahn bridge near Kaiserslautern destroyed by German engineers near the war’s end made long stretches of the autobahn useless. The 503rd built a by pass road around the bridge to facilitate traffic movement on the Autobahn. In early 1951, the entire company moved from Taylor to Ettlingen, near Karlsruhe. At this time the 501st & 502nd Engineer Companies were also at Taylor Barracks but the 501st was deactivated in 1950 and in early 1951, the 502nd, a pontoon bridge unit, moved to Phillips Barracks, Karlsruhe.

== Cold War ==
The 109th Engineer Battalion, a South Dakota National Guard unit called up during the Korean War, arrived in Germany in June 1951 and was quartered in Taylor Barracks assigned to the 11th Engineer Group. The 109th was in charge of nine bridges over the Rhine river. Standard M2 Bailey Bridges were mounted on M4 floating metal pontoons, with half of the bridge on each side of the river. The bridge halves would swing from each side of the river and when they met in the middle of the river they were fastened together with huge steel pins. Each line company was in charge of three bridges that were spaced at various distances along the Rhine, some as far as 30 miles apart. Their second mission was to destroy all the bridges across the Rhine in case of a Soviet invasion. The battalion was replaced by the 37th Engineer Battalion in 1954. The 11th Engr Grp also developed the Class 100 Heavy Raft for tactical river crossings. The raft was an emergency means of crossing the Rhine River with heavy loads.

As of October 1955, the units on Taylor were 11th Engineer Group (which moved to Tompkins Bks, Schwetzingen, later), 37th Engineer Bn (which was inactivated in 1958), 535th Engineer Co (a Light Equipment unit), 350th Infantry Regiment (which moved to Livorno, Italy, in 1956 to be part of the new Southern European Task Force) and 427th Counterintelligence Corps Detachment (Team 23).

In 1958, 547th Engineer Battalion returned to Germany following a "gyroscope" move, that is, a temporary relocation of a unit to the United States, and was stationed on Kelley Barracks, Darmstadt. The 547th was an 11th Engr Gp unit supplemented with two additional companies from the inactivating 37th Engr Bn, in 1962 Companies D and E of the 547th were moved to Tompkins Barracks and became Companies of the 20th Eng Bn the following year. On 15 March 1963, by General Order Number 13 from Seventh Army, the following provisional redesignations took effect: Company D, 547th Engineer Battalion became Company D, 20th Engineer Battalion; Company E, 547th Engineer Battalion became Company E, 20th Engineer Battalion; and Company D, 299th Engineer Battalion became Company F, 20th Engineer Battalion.

Companies D and F and HHC were co-located with the battalion Headquarters at River Barracks, Giessen, Germany, and Company E was stationed at Taylor Barracks, Mannheim, Germany. Rivers Barracks was originally Verdun Kaserne, a German installation built for Signal units. It was renamed by the Americans after World War II, for Staff Sergeant Rubin Rivers of Company A, 761st Tank Battalion.

The 547th Eng Bn continued its bridging operations, training exercises and community support projects through the early 1960s. In 1963 547th regained company D and E and the 20th Eng rotated to Fort Devons, MASS. The battalion headquarters returned to Fort Devens in September 1963. Company A was reconstituted at Fort Devens and Headquarters assumed control of the line companies, including B and C, later that month.

Companies A and C, 115th Supply and Service Battalion, were quartered at Taylor Barracks in 1963. Company C was a civilian labor service company that provided daily labor details to the various operational sites in the battalion. The 115th had its HQ on Autobahn Kaserne, Seckenheim, and was a 1st Support Bde unit from 1965-1970.

HHD, 22nd Signal Group was activated in 1964 and located in Building 346 on Taylor Barracks until 1974 when it was inactivated. It commanded 68th Signal Battalion located at Nellingen Airfield (with companies in Karlsruhe, Neu Ulm and Giessen) and the 447th Sig Bn located in Prüm (with companies in Prüm, Linderhofe, Bremerhaven and Camp Darby). The 22nd was replaced by 2nd Signal Group which was reactivated in June, 1974 and redesignated a brigade in 1979.

The 1st Support Brigade was activated in June 1965 as a subordinate maintenance support headquarters under the Seventh Army Support Command. The newly formed brigade headquarters was organized around the nucleus of the headquarters of the recently inactivated 521st Engineer Group. The brigade’s offices at Taylor were in buildings 333 and 335. When the 7th Army Support Command was dissolved in 1970, the brigade became a major subordinate headquarters under the Theater Army Support Command, Europe (TASCOM) with some of its units stationed on Taylor such as HHD, 81st Maint Bn, 77th Maint Co (Hvy Equip), 81st Maint Co (Lt Equip) and Equipment Support Center Mannheim.

TASCOM was a unit that had responsibility for all logistics depots in France and Germany. When TASCOM merged with U.S. Army Europe headquarters in 1974, the missions of 1st Support Brigade were expanded to include base operations support for eight military communities as well as the management of regional area support. The brigade was upgraded to a general officer command and the headquarters moved to Panzer Kaserne, Kaiserslautern, Germany, (becoming 21st Support Command, now 21st Theater Sustainment Command). At the same time, the HQ, 15th MP Brigade and half of the USAREUR Office of the Provost Marshal staff moved into part of Building 333 (15th had been on ROB Kaserne in Kaiserslautern and OPM came from Building 7, Campbell Bks, Heidelberg). The USAREUR Provost Marshal had become the Mannheim Community Commander, assisted by a deputy community commander who managed nearly 1,400 soldiers and civilians of the new U.S. Military Community Activity-Mannheim created as one of the 21st SUPCOM communities. USMCA-Mannheim provided base operations support for tenant units in the Mannheim area with its headquarters staff in Building 335 on Taylor and other sections in various buildings around the post. That same year, HHC, 42nd MP Group (Customs) moved from Campbell Bks, Heidelberg, to the other half of Building 333 and parts of Bldg 334 on Taylor Bks. The group was charged with providing customs enforcement and maintaining liaison and cooperation with German customs authorities. The other half of OPM moved to Bldg 333 after the 15th Military Police Brigade was inactivated in 1976

In 1975 the Equipment Support Center, Mannheim (ESCM) and the 77th Maint Co were reassigned from the 81st Maint Bn to the 51st Maint Bn. At that time the unit used buildings 346, 369, 374, 351 and 357. During June 1976, the 77th Maint Co was deactivated and reformed as the 8908th Civilian Support Group (General Support), a maintenance unit. The facility that became Maintenance Activity Mannheim was constructed on the south side of Taylor in the early 80s; building 428 in 1982 and building 429 in 1983.

Also in 1975 the 8368th CSG (part of 6966th Civilian Support Center in Kaiserslautern) was activated as a heavy equipment transporter company located at Taylor Barracks. Its big tank transporters occupied the motor pool next to the parade field and moved the tanks of the armored brigade stationed on Sullivan. The unit later moved to Coleman and inactivated in 1993.

Company "A" 95th Military Police Battalion later named the 272nd MP Company (Fighting Deuce) was also located on Taylor Barracks.
