= Kaserne =

German loanword meaning "barracks"

Kaserne is a loanword in English derived from the German term Kaserne (plural: Kasernen), meaning a military barracks or barracks complex. In English‑language military contexts, the term is commonly used to refer to German‑built garrison facilities occupied by American and Canadian forces stationed in Germany. Some U.S. installations, however, retained English names using the word "barracks," such as Ray Barracks in Friedberg.

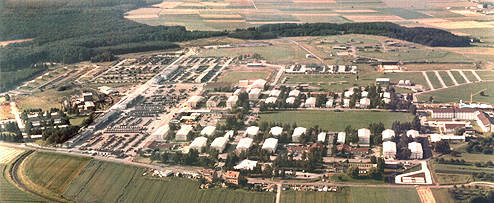
Ayers Kaserne, U.S. Army Europe, Kirch-Göns, West Germany, 1985. Tanks, armoured personnel carriers (APCs), and artillery typical of U.S. Army Cold War‑era equipment are visible in the motor pools.

American forces within a kaserne could range in size anywhere from company size, with a few hundred troops and equipment, to brigade level formation with supporting units, or approximately three to five thousand troops and their equipment. The largest single unit combat force in Germany, the First Brigade of the U.S. 3rd Armored Division was housed at Ayers Kaserne, Kirch-Göns, Germany, also known as "The Rock". While several dozen kasernes with NATO forces were once spread across the American sector of Germany, after the end of the Cold War, many have since closed, and some have been demolished.

Most army posts within the United States house units and/or multiple units of a much larger size than one would find in a kaserne. These installations are typically called "forts", such as Fort Knox, Fort Campbell, Fort Dix etc. National Guard and Reserve installations, though sometimes designated as "forts", are more often referred to as "camps".

By contrast, British Forces in Germany used the term 'barracks' for locations containing one or a small number of units. For larger bases with several units, 'station' (e.g. Hohne Station) or 'complex' (e.g. Rheindahlen Military Complex) was used; 'garrison' referred to a number of barracks within the same general geographical area that formed the home for a formation such as a brigade.

== See also ==
- Coleman Kaserne
- Husterhoeh Kaserne
