= Stäbler =

Stäbler, Staebler
Origin
- Language: German
- Meaning: Middle High German stebelære > "official or servant who makes or carries staff"
- Region of origin: Germany (first mentioned on 1356 at Regensburg, as "der Stæbelær")

Other names
- Variant forms: Stabler, Staebler, Stebler, Stöbler, Stab

Stäbler or Staebler is a German occupational surname, which means an official who carries a staff as a symbol of office, from the Middle High German stebelære. The name may refer to:

== People ==
- Barbara Stäbler, Swiss judo competitor
- David L. Staebler (born 1940), American electrical engineer
- Edna Staebler (1906–2006), Canadian writer
- Edward W. Staebler (1872–1946), Michigan politician
- Frank Stäbler (born 1989), German wrestler
- Gerhard Stäbler (born 1949), German composer
- Helen Waimel Robertson (1917–2002), née Staebler, Estonian-Canadian sculptor
- Horst Stäbler, German driver at the 1996 BPR 4 Hours of Nürburgring
- Jacob Staebler (1846–1906), Canadian politician
- Karl Stäbler, German communist resistance operative with Else Himmelheber
- Michael Staebler (1843–?), builder of the Germania Building Complex in Ann Arbor, Michigan, United States
- Neil Staebler (1905–2000), American politician
- Robby Staebler, member of American rock band All Them Witches
- Stephen De Staebler (1933–2011), American sculptor

== Fictional characters ==
- Jason Staebler, a character in The King of Marvin Gardens

== Other uses ==
- Edna Staebler Award, a Canadian literary award
- Staebler–Wronski effect
- Moravian Anabaptist faction c. 1527
- Bus transport company operating in Stuttgart

== See also ==
- Stabler
- Stebler
