= Stambler =

Stambler is a surname. Notable people with the surname include:

- Howard Stambler
- Bruce Stambler, American sound editor

== See also ==
- Stabler (disambiguation)
