= Edwin Mayser =

German scholar and gymnasial teacher (1859–1937)

- Born: 26 April 1859; Riedlingen, Germany
- Died: 5 May 1937; Degerloch, Germany

Franz Edwin Mayser (26 April 1859, Riedlingen – 5 May 1937, Degerloch) was German classical scholar and gymnasial teacher (in Heilbronn and Stuttgart).

He composed a grammar of Greek Ptolemaic papyri, which took about 40 years to be competed. After finishing the second volume (Syntax), he set on a new edition of the first one. He had time to complete two parts (Morphology and Word formation), but the very first part (Introduction and Phonology) remained unfinished. Hans Widmann had taken the task to complete the edition, but he was unable to do it. Eventually the volume I/1 was published by Hans Schmoll (1970).

Mayser was buried on 7 May 1937 in Tübingen.

== Family ==
Mayser was married twice.

- On 12 July 1887 in Stuttgart he married Anna Maria Schwarz (27 March 1861, Wiblingen – 8 June 1824, Tübingen), daughter of Rechnungsrat August Schwarz.
- On 23 April 1927 in Stuttgart he married Clara Sophie Nestle (known as Clara Mayser-Nestle; 30 April 1884, Hochberg, Württemberg – ?), daughter of priest Martin Nestle and Emma Kaufmann. Clara was a pianist.

== Publications ==
- Grammatik der griechischen Papyri aus der Ptolemäerzeit mit Einschluss der gleichzeitigen Ostraka und der in Ägypten verfassten Inschriften.
  - Band I: Laut- und Wortlehre. Teubner, 1906 (Neue Ausgabe De Gruyter, 1923).
    - I. Teil: Einleitung und Lautlehre. 2. Aufl. bearbeitet von Hans Schmoll: De Gruyter, 1970.
    - II. Teil: Flexionslehre. 2. Aufl. De Gruyter, 1938.
    - III. Teil: Stammbildung. 2. Aufl. De Gruyter, 1936.
  - Band II.1: Satzlehre. Analytischer Teil. Erste Hälfte. De Gruyter, 1926.
  - Band II.2: Satzlehre. Analytischer Teil. Zweite Hälfte. De Gruyter, 1934.
  - Band II.3: Satzlehre. Synthetischer Teil. De Gruyter, 1934.

== Sources ==
- Hans Widmann. Edwin Mayser (Nekrolog) // Jahresbericht über die Fortschritte der klassischen Altertumwissenschaft, Bd. 147, Beiblatt: Jahrbuch für Altertumskunde. 1940. S. 1–15.
- Josef Mayser. Die Mayser aus den Donaustädten Riedlingen und Ulm in Württemberg: Die Geschlechterfolgen und zugleich eine Chronik der Familienstämme bis in die Gegenwart. 1959.
