= Stuttgart Rack Railway =

Narrow gauge rack railway in Stuttgart, Germany

Coordinates: 48°45′19″N 9°10′20″E

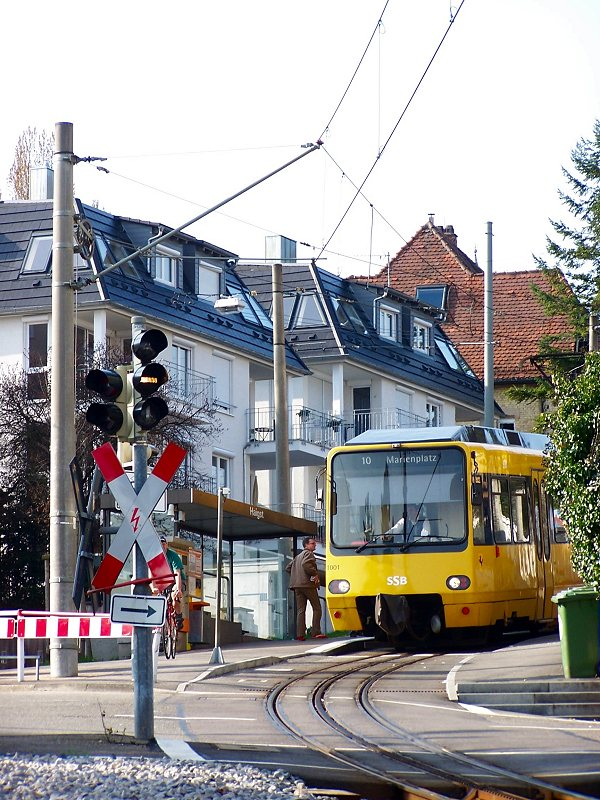
- Rack Railway at Haigst

Overview
- Native name: Zahnradbahn Stuttgart
- Owner: Stuttgarter Straßenbahnen

Service
- Route number: 10
- Operator: Stuttgarter Straßenbahnen
- Depot: Near Marienplatz
- Rolling stock: 3 × ZT 4.2

History
- Opened: 23 August 1884; 142 years ago

Technical
- Line length: 2.2 km (1.4 mi)
- Rack system: Riggenbach system
- Track gauge: 1,000 mm (3 ft 3 3/8 in) metre gauge
- Electrification: 750 V DC from overhead catenary
- Maximum incline: 17.8%

The Stuttgart Rack Railway (German: Zahnradbahn Stuttgart) is an electric rack railway in Stuttgart, Germany, known affectionately as the Zacke (spike) or Zacketse by the local residents. The line opened on 23 August 1884 and links Marienplatz in the city centre to Degerloch on the Filder plateau. It is integrated with the Stadtbahn network of the Stuttgarter Straßenbahnen (SSB) and since 1978 has been line 10 (before this it was line 30). At Marienplatz it connects with lines U1 and U14 and at Degerloch it connects with lines U5, U6, U8 and U12. Ordinary VVS tickets are valid.

The line is one of only four rack railways operating in Germany, along with the Bavarian Zugspitze Railway, the Drachenfels Railway and the Wendelstein Railway, and is the only one used primarily as public transport. The rack railway is one of two working railway lines that are tourist attractions in Stuttgart; the other being the Stuttgart funicular railway that leads to the forest cemetery, and operates as SSB line 20. It is also a rare example of a rack railway operating within a city (others include the Dolderbahn and Principe–Granarolo rack railway).

== Route ==
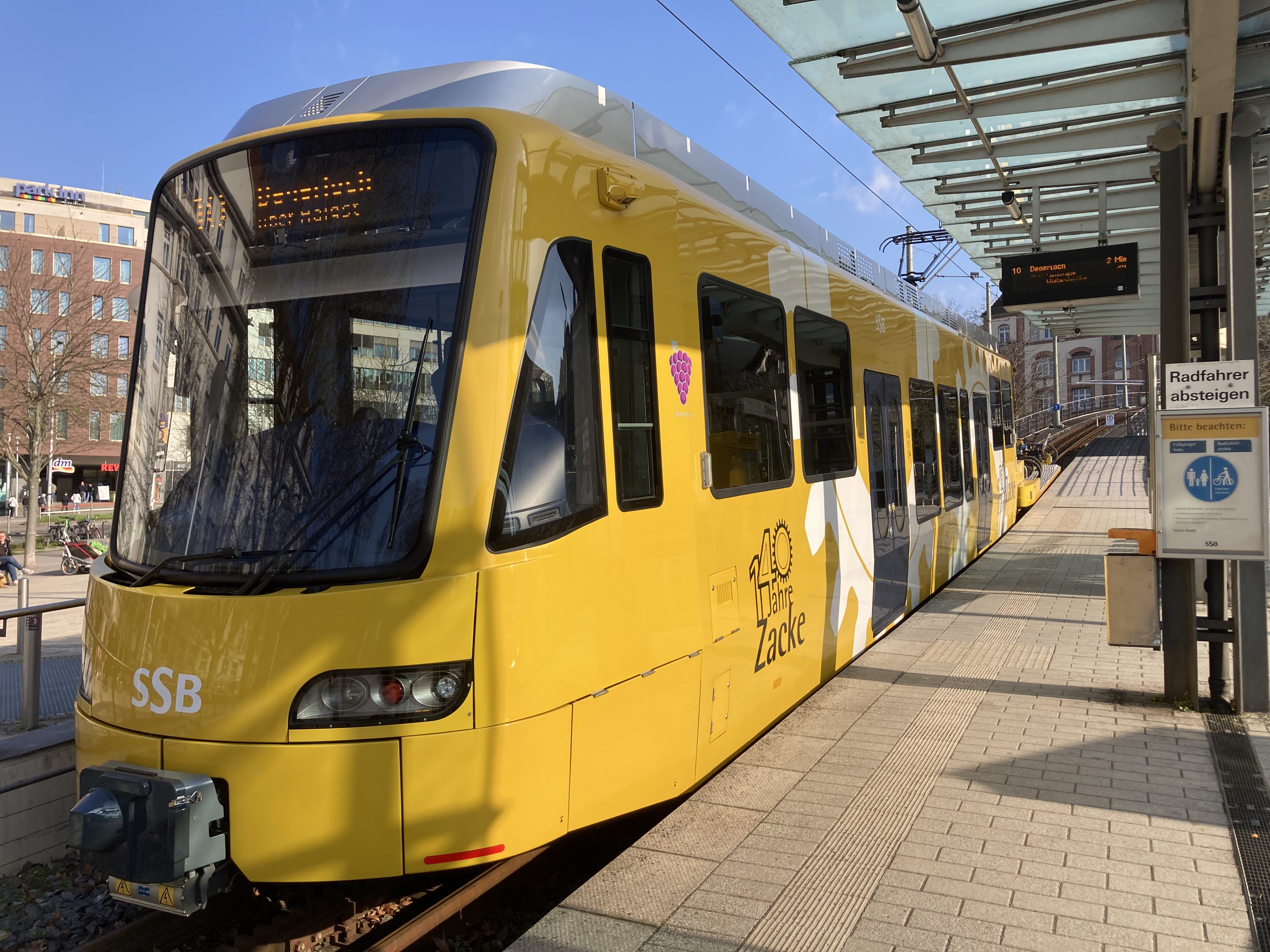
Rack Railway at Marienplatz

The line connects the urban districts of Stuttgart South (Marienplatz) and Degerloch (Albplatz). The route runs along the Alte Weinsteige, which was historically the main route to the Filder towns until the Neue Weinsteige was built in 1826.

Over its first 2.2-kilometre (1.4 mi) route the line climbs a height of 210 metres (690 ft) (from 266 to 465 metres (873 to 1,526 ft) AMSL), before descending slightly to the terminus at Degerloch. The maximum grade on the route is 17.8% (between Liststraße and Pfaffenweg). From Liststraße there is a branch line to the depot with a maximum gradient of 23.2%. The line is entirely single track except a passing loop at Wielandshöhe. Between the stops at Pfaffenweg and Wielandshöhe there is a view of Stuttgart's city centre.

The line uses the Riggenbach rack system, but the rack rail is lower than usual because on some parts of the route the track is in the street.

== Bicycle transport ==
The third and fourth generation railcars have trailers for the transport of bikes. These are flat wagons which are always on the uphill side of the railcar. Bikes can only be carried in the uphill direction and only for the entire journey from Marienplatz to Degerloch.

== Rolling stock ==
=== ZT 4.1 ===
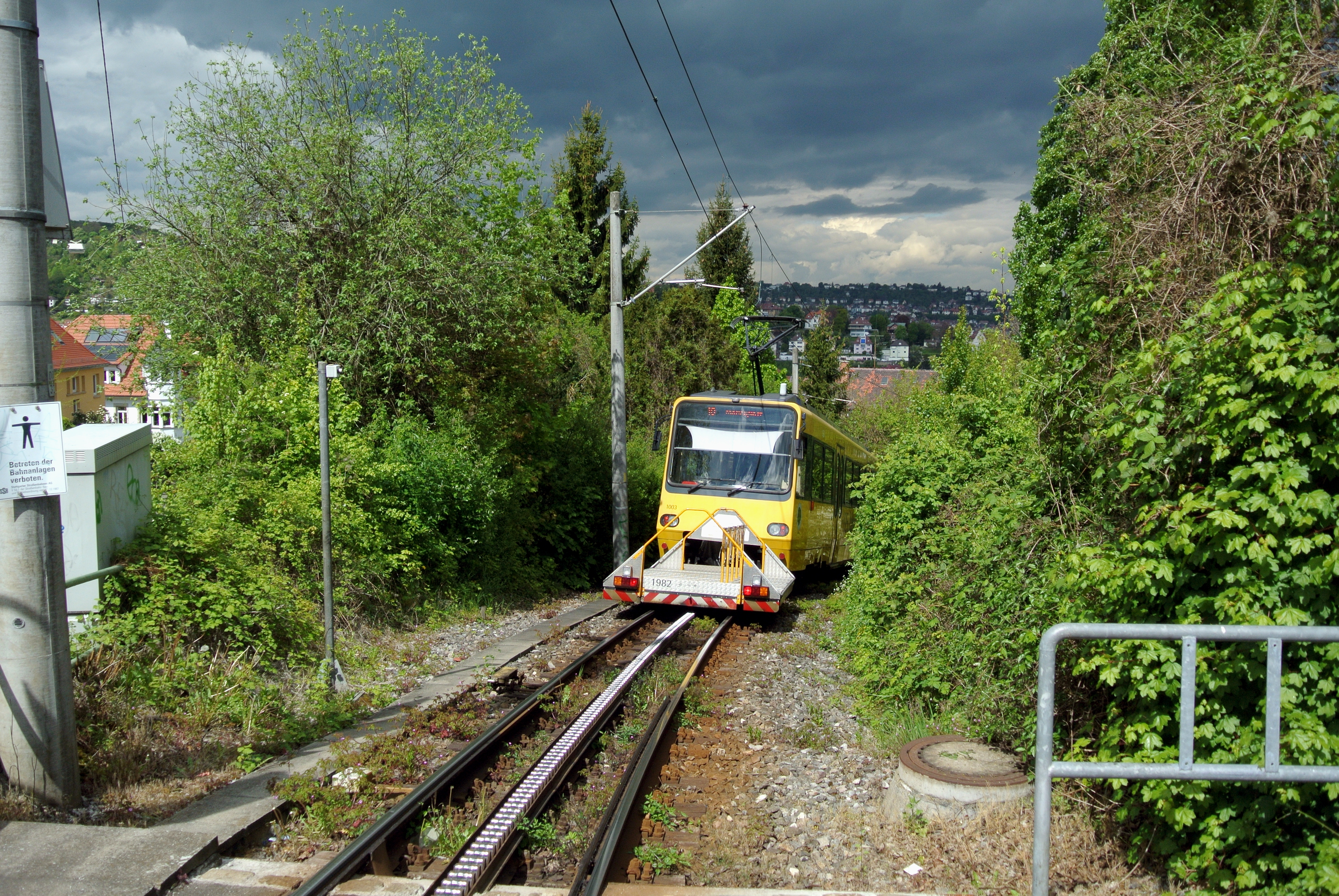
ZT 4.1 railcar heading downhill between Pfaffenweg and Liststraße stations, with wagon to transport bicycles

The rack railway was modernised in 1982 with the third generation of electric railcars. These are bogie railcars of type ZT 4.1, numbered 1001-1003 and named Heslach, Degerloch and Helene. The bodies were built by MAN, and have a similar design to the SSB DT 8 built at the same time, while the rack bogies were supplied by SLM. Two special flat wagons for transporting bikes were delivered in 1983, each with a capacity of 10 bikes.

Following the replacement of the ZT 4.1 in 2022 one of them (1003, Helene) is in the Stuttgart Tram Museum.

=== ZT 4.2 ===
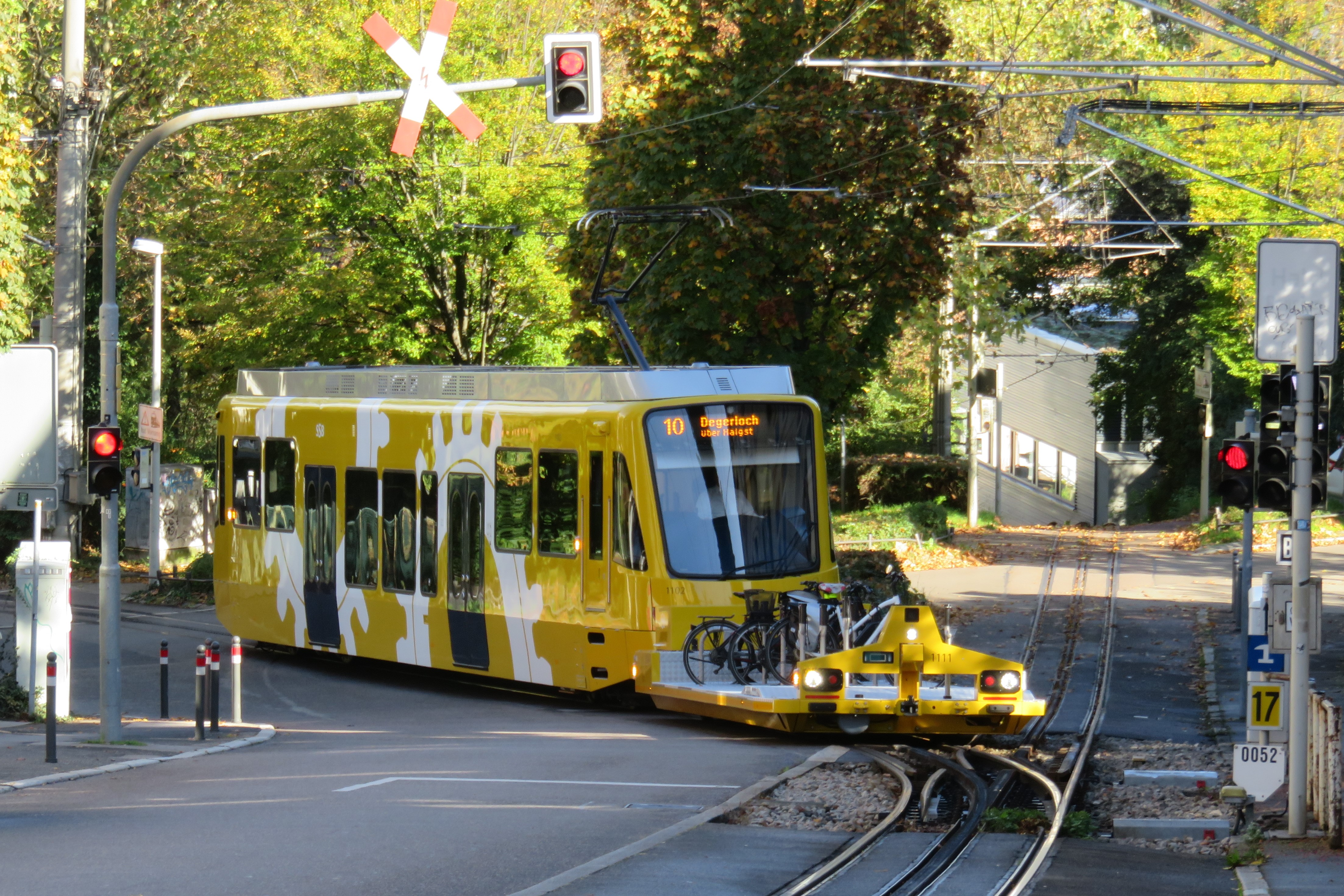
A ZT 4.2 railcar with a new bicycle trailer in front.

The fourth generation of electric railcars, type ZT 4.2, were built by Stadler Rail, with the first delivered to Stuttgart in Autumn 2021 and entering service in October 2022. They are numbered 1101-1103 and named Weinsteige, Degerloch and Haigst. The railcars look similar to the DT 8.12 vehicles, also built by Stadler, but the rack railway vehicles are only single cars and have a low-floor section in the centre, to improve accessibility for wheelchairs and pushchairs. The maximum speed is 30 km/h (19 mph) uphill and 21 km/h (13 mph) downhill. Each railcar has 51 seats and a total capacity of 115 passengers.

Three new bike trailers were also built for use with the new railcars. These are 12 m long, more than twice the length of the previous bike trailers, and have capacity for 20 bikes and one cargo bike.

== History ==
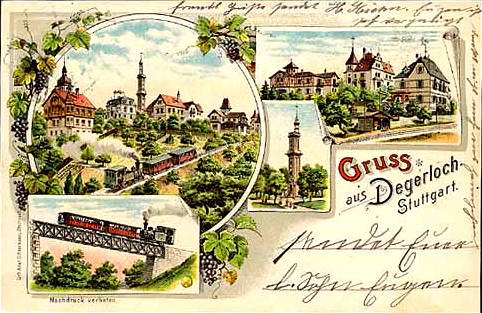
Steam Rack Railway 1897

- 23 August 1884: Opening of the Stuttgart - Degerloch rack railway, the first section of the Filderbahn line, as a narrow gauge (1,000 mm (3 ft 3 3/8 in)) steam-operated railway with a Riggenbach system. The Filderbahn Company operated the route from Stuttgart to Degerloch station.
- 1902: Electrification of the rack railway and the adhesion routes from Degerloch to Hohenheim and from Möhringen to Vaihingen. Electrification of the rack railway line was delayed by two years due to technical problems.
- 1903: The passing loop was relocated from Haigst to Wielandshöhe.
- 1904: Electric operation began on the rack railway, with steam operation still required for excursion traffic.
- 1918: Two additional steam engines taken over second-hand from the Swiss Brünigbahn railway for steam services which had increased due to the war.
- 1920: Filderbahn taken over by the city of Stuttgart and its management transferred to the Stuttgarter Straßenbahnen.
- 1921: Steam operations ended.
- 1926: All passenger coaches on the rack railway and Filderbahn repainted to SSB livery. However, to distinguish SSB-owned vehicles from Filderbahn-owned vehicles, the latter provisionally prefixed their vehicle numbers with the letter "F".
- 1934: Filderbahn and the rack railway transfer to the ownership of the Stuttgarter Straßenbahnen.
- 1935: First two railcars with 3 axles are delivered, number 101 (in service until 1982) and 102 (scrapped due to damage in 1974).
- 1936: The lower station was relocated to Marienplatz to improve transfers to the trams. The original lower station is now the location of the depot.
- 1937: Motor coach 103 was the first vehicle built entirely of steel to be delivered to the SSB.
- 1950: Last two coaches of the second generation railcars delivered, number 104 (today a museum railcar) and 105 (dismantled in 1995).
- 1954: Last railcar of the first generation, number 109, is taken out of service.
- 1956: Transfer of trailer(s) from the Filderbahn to the rack railway to handle the increased school traffic. This was however extremely rarely done and then only up to 1965 when the practice was discontinued.
- 1965: Replacement of the old cast iron bridge, manufactured by Maschinenfabrik Esslingen, over the Neue Weinsteige by the present-day reinforced concrete bridge. The old bridge was commonly called the Turkish bridge (Türkenbrücke) because it was originally intended to be delivered to a railway in Turkey.
- 1971: As a result construction of the Stadtbahn at Marienplatz, the two-track rack railway station was replaced by a single-track station, half of which was located on the bridge across a water reservoir (later filled in).
- 1974: Railcar number 102, recently taken out of service, was paraded in the Stuttgart Shrove Tuesday procession as an attraction.
- 1977: As a result of the rebuilding of the rack railway's Degerloch station, the connecting track to the adhesion railway was lifted and the rack railway became isolated from the rest of the SSB network.
- 1978: Cessation of routine three-coach working.
- 1980: The rack railway was closed for refurbishment including the platforms depot, overhead line and power supply ready for the newly commissioned ZT 4.1 railcars.
- 1984: Centenary celebrations and last school run on the traditional rack railway route by motor coach 104 and demonstration car 120.
- 1989: Replacement of the former swinging leaf doors on the ZT 4.1 by appropriate external swing out doors on the DT8.
- 1992: Passenger carriage 117 (built in 1896) was sold to the Härtsfeldbahn museum railway in Neresheim, having been owned by a private collector since 1983. The museum employs it today as a narrow gauge passenger carriage on its own line.
- 1994: The top of the line was extended to Albplatz to improve connections to the Stadtbahn.
- 2002: Reopening of the rebuilt terminal and bridge at the entirely redesigned and modernized Marienplatz (6 December).
- 2004: Replacement of the track superstructure; partial laying of a new, slightly narrower rack rail.

== See also ==
- List of rack railways
- Rail transport in Germany
