= Stabler (surname) =

- Languages: English, German

Origin
- Languages: 1. Middle English; 2. Middle High German
- Origin: 1. stabler 2. stebaere
- Meaning: 1. keeper of a stable 2. one who carries a staff

Other names
- Related names: Stäbler, Staebler, Stebler

Stabler is a surname from several European languages. Most common among these are the English occupational surname for one who keeps livestock, from Middle English stabler, or a variant of the German occupational surname Stäbler (also Staebler or Stebler) meaning an official who carries a staff of office.

The name may refer to:

== People ==
- Arthur Fletcher Stabler, mayor of Newcastle upon Tyne, 1983
- Carl Stabler, former manager and chairman of the Wick Football Club
- Daniel Stabler, pseudonym of German expressionist poet, critic and writer Ernst Blass (1890–1939)
- David Stabler, pseudonym of American author Robert Schnakenberg
- David Stabler, music critic for The Oregonian and 2003 Pulitzer Prize finalist for feature writing
- Donald B. Stabler (1908–1997), founder of Stabler Companies, philanthropist, and Lehigh University trustee; see Stabler Arena
- Edward Stabler, mayor of York, England, 1779–1780
- Edward Stabler, founder and proprietor of the Stabler-Leadbeater Apothecary Shop
- Edward Stabler, Professor of Linguistics at the University of California, Los Angeles
- Griffin M. Stabler, American businessman with Whitney Brothers
- Harold Stabler (1872–1945), English designer and craftsman
- Harry P. Stabler, State Assembly member representing California's 13th district, 1891–1893
- James P. Stabler (1796–1840), chief engineer for two of the earliest US railroads
- Jane Stabler, English literary scholar and author, and 2003 winner of the Rose Mary Crawshay Prize
- Jane Stabler, Scottish actress in The Acid House
- John Stabler, U.S. State Department emissary to Colombia 1927–1928; involved in the unsuccessful Barco oil concession negotiations
- John G. Stabler (1871–1940), Chief Justice of the South Carolina Supreme Court, 1935–1940
- Ken Stabler (1945–2015), American football player
- Kirk B. Stabler, 18th Commander of the U.S. Air Force Office of Special Investigations
- Lonnie Stabler (1945–2013), mayor of Bryan, Texas (1995–2001)
- Oscar Richard Stabler, convicted member of the Nazi Duquesne Spy Ring
- Phoebe Stabler (1879–1955), English artist
- Sam Stabler, 3000 m bronze medalist at the 2016 British Indoor Athletics Championships
- Samuel Stabler, mayor of Williamsport, Pennsylvania, 1911–1916
- Simon Stabler, member of the Destructors, 2006–2008
- Steve Stabler, co-founder of Motion Picture Corporation of America, co-president of Orion Pictures, co-founder of Destination Films
- Sydney Martyn Stabler, British diplomat, Officer of the Order of the British Empire, 1947
- V. P. Stabler, sheriff involved in the 1911 opera house lynching in Livermore, Kentucky
- Vernon Stabler, owner of the Little-Stabler House, a home listed on the National Register of Historic Places in Butler County, Alabama
- W. Laird Stabler Jr. (1930–2008), American attorney and politician, Delaware Attorney General
- Wells Stabler (1919–2009), American ambassador to Jordan and Spain

== Fictional characters ==
- Anna Stabler, in the musical A Christmas Memory, based on the Truman Capote short story
- Bucky Stabler, in The Good Wife
- Carol Stabler, in the 1987 television series Beauty and the Beast
- Chris Stabler, in the 1978 television series The Next Step Beyond episode "The Haunted Inn"
- Danny Stabler, in the 2014 film Blood and Circumstance
- Dwayne Stabler, in the 1978 television film A Question of Love played by Ned Beatty
- Elliot Stabler, on the television series Law and Order: SVU
- Herb Stabler, in the play Herb Stabler, Wandering Spirit by Mike Beyer, performed at the Factory Theater in 1999
- Kathy Stabler, Bernie Stabler, and other family members, on the television series Law and Order: SVU
- Lisa and Tom Stabler, in the 1971 Mannix episode "Murder Times Three"
- Mrs. Stabler, in the 2014 film Blood and Circumstance played by Cynthia Watros
- Ray and Shirley Stabler, on the 2013–2020 television series Mom

== See also ==
- Stabler (disambiguation)
