= Jeff MacSwan =

American linguist and researcher

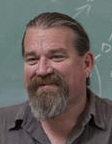
- MacSwan (2008)
- Born: Los Angeles, California, United States
- Spouse: Dr. Kellie Rolstad (1996-present)
- Children: Three

Academic background
- Education: University of California, Los Angeles (PhD)
- Thesis: A Minimalist Approach to Intrasentential Code Switching: Spanish-Nahuatl Bilingualism in Central Mexico (1997)
- Doctoral advisor: Concepción Valadez
- Other advisors: Edward Stabler; Reynaldo Macias; Susan Curtiss; Alfredo Artiles

Academic work
- Discipline: linguistics
- Sub-discipline: Code-switching, minimalist syntax
- Institutions: University of Maryland

Jeff MacSwan is an American linguist and educational researcher, working in the United States. He is currently Professor of Applied Linguistics and Language Education in the Division of Language, Literacy, and Social Inquiry in the Department of Teaching and Learning, Policy and Leadership at the University of Maryland. He is also Professor in the Neuroscience and Cognitive Science Program there, and Affiliate Professor in the University of Maryland Linguistics Department and Center for the Advanced Study of Language. He is a Fellow of the American Educational Research Association (AERA) and of the National Education Policy Center (NEPC).

MacSwan's applied research program is focused on the role of language in learning and on education policy related to bilingual learners in US schools. MacSwan also conducts basic scientific research in bilingualism, with a focus on the study of bilingual codeswitching. He has achieved national and international notoriety for his contributions in both areas. He is the author of numerous publications, and the editor of the International Multilingual Research Journal.

== Representative publications ==
- MacSwan, J. (2017). A multilingual perspective on translanguaging. American Educational Research Journal, 54(1), 167–201. DOI: 10.3102/0002831216683935.
- MacSwan, J. (ed.) (2014). Grammatical Theory and Bilingual Codeswitching. Linguistics series. Cambridge: MIT Press. ISBN 978-0-262-02789-2.
- Krashen, S., Rolstad, K. & MacSwan, J. (2012). Review of “Research summary and bibliography for Structured English Immersion programs” of the Arizona English Language Learners Task Force, pp. 107–119. In C. Faltis & B. Arias (eds.) English Learners in Arizona. Bristol, UK: Multilingual Matters.
- van Gelderen, E. & MacSwan, J. (2008). Interface conditions and code-switching: Pronouns, lexical DPs, and checking theory. Lingua, 118(6), 765-776.
- MacSwan, J., & Rolstad, K. (2006). How language tests mislead us about children's abilities: Implications for special education placements. Teachers College Record, 108(11), 2304–2328.
- MacSwan, J., & Pray, L. (2005). Learning English bilingually: Age of onset of exposure and rate of acquisition of English among children in a bilingual education program. Bilingual Research Journal, 29(3), 687-712.
- Thompson, M. S., DiCerbo, K., Mahoney, K. S., & MacSwan, J. (2002). ¿Éxito en California? A validity critique of language program evaluations and analysis of English learner test scores. Education Policy Analysis Archives, 10(7), entire issue.
- MacSwan, J. (2000). The architecture of the bilingual language faculty: Evidence from codeswitching. Bilingualism: Language and Cognition, 3(1), 37-54.
- MacSwan, J. (1999). A Minimalist Approach to Intrasentential Code Switching. New York: Garland. ISBN 978-0815332749.
