= Stabler =

Stabler may refer to:

== Places ==
- Stabler, Washington, U.S., an unincorporated community
- Stabler Arena, a multipurpose venue in Bethlehem, Pennsylvania, U.S.
- Donald B. and Dorothy L. Stabler Health Sciences Building, academic building on the campus of Central Penn College, Pennsylvania, U.S.
- L. V. Stabler Memorial Hospital, a hospital in Greenville, Alabama
- Stabler Estate, former property of James P. Stabler, now the campus of the University of Maryland, Baltimore County

== Other uses ==
- Stabler (surname), an English and German surname, including notable people with the name
- "Stabler", a single released by The Prettiots from the 2015 album Funs Cool

== See also ==
- Stäbler
- Stäbler (coin)
- Stebler
