= Stab =

STAB or stab or stabs may refer to:

- Stabbing, penetration or contact with a sharp object

== Places ==
- Stab, Kentucky, US
- St. Anne's-Belfield School, a college preparatory school in Charlottesville, Virginia, US

== People and characters ==
- Staff captain (stab captain)
  - Stabs-captain (Russian: штабс-капитан, lit. 'staff captain') of Russia
  - Stabs-kapitan (German: Stabskapitän, lit. 'staff captain') of Prussia

=== Persons ===
- Johann Stab, Johannes Stabius (1450–1522), Austrian cartographer
- Seven Stabs, member of the band The Redneck Manifesto

=== Fictional characters ===
- Mr. Stabs, a fictional character from Ace of Wands

== Arts, entertainment, media ==
- Stab (b-boy move), a breakdance technique
- Stab (music), an element in musical composition
- "Stab", a song by Built to Spill from There's Nothing Wrong with Love
- Stab, the film-within-a-film from the Scream franchise

== Transportation, vehicular ==
- Stab jacket or buoyancy compensator, a piece of diving equipment
- Stab (Luftwaffe designation), during World War II, a German designation for command aircraft or headquarters units
- Stabilizer (aircraft)
- Strike Assault Boat

== Other uses ==
- Sodium triacetoxyborohydride, a reducing agent used in organic synthesis
- Symbol table, a data structure used by a language translator
- stabs (STABS), a debugging data format
- Operation Stab, a July 1942 WWII British military operation against the Japanese

== See also ==
- Stabb (surname)
