= Stuttgarter Straßenbahnen =

German public transport operating company

Coordinates: 48.724°N 9.130°E

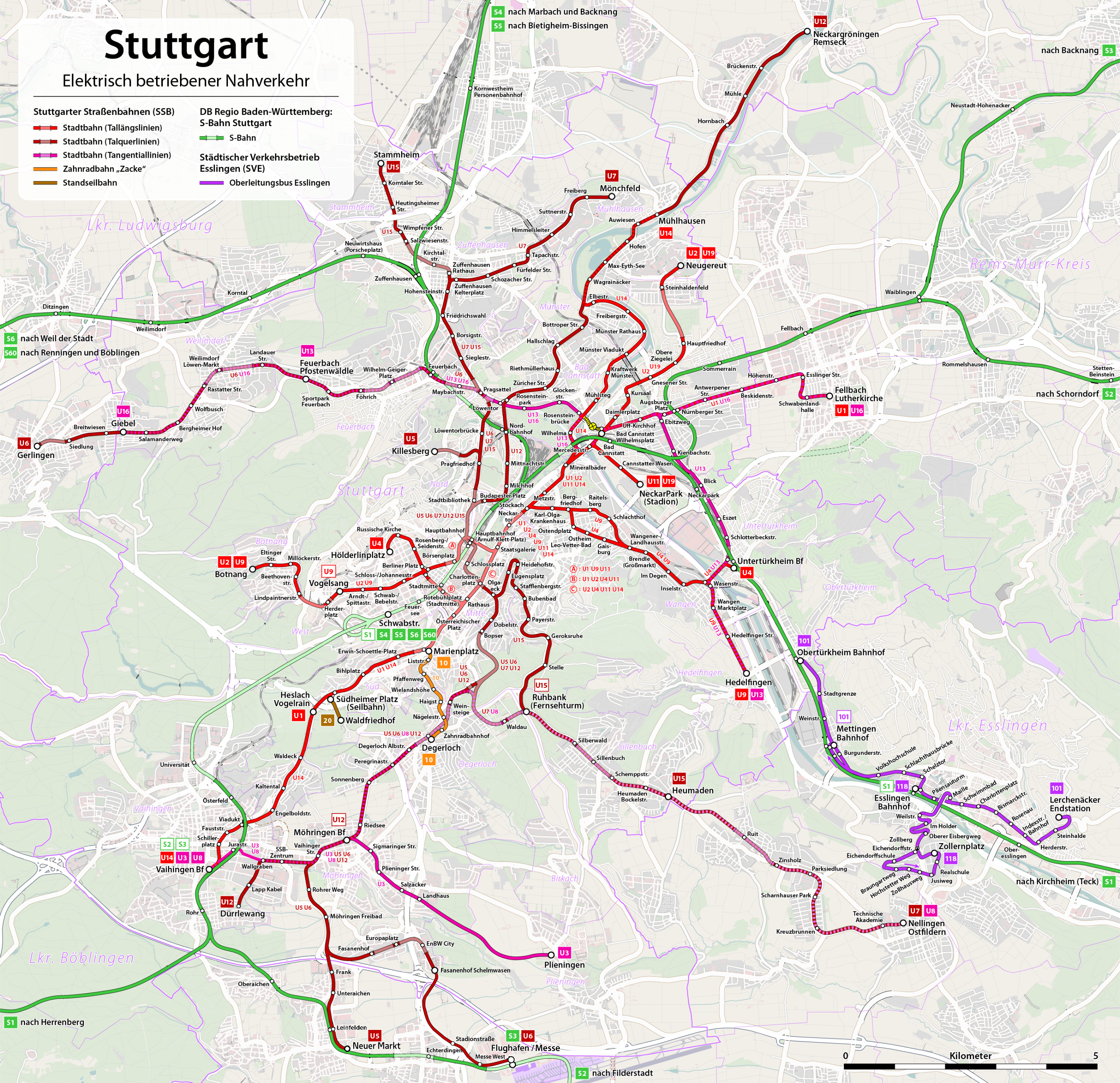
Transport network

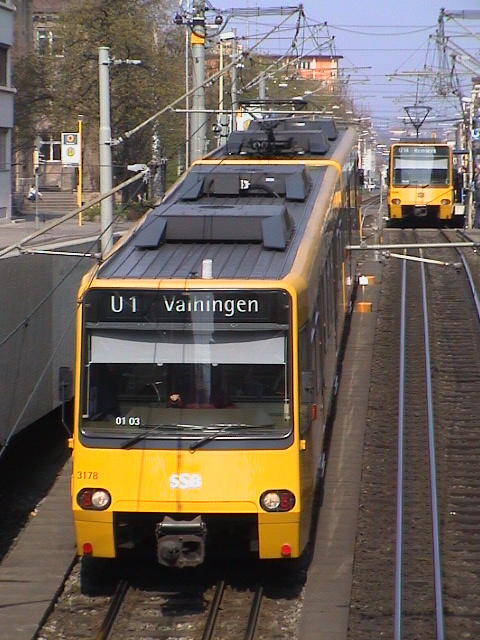
Light rail line U1 between Stöckach and Neckartor; mixed gauge track can be seen

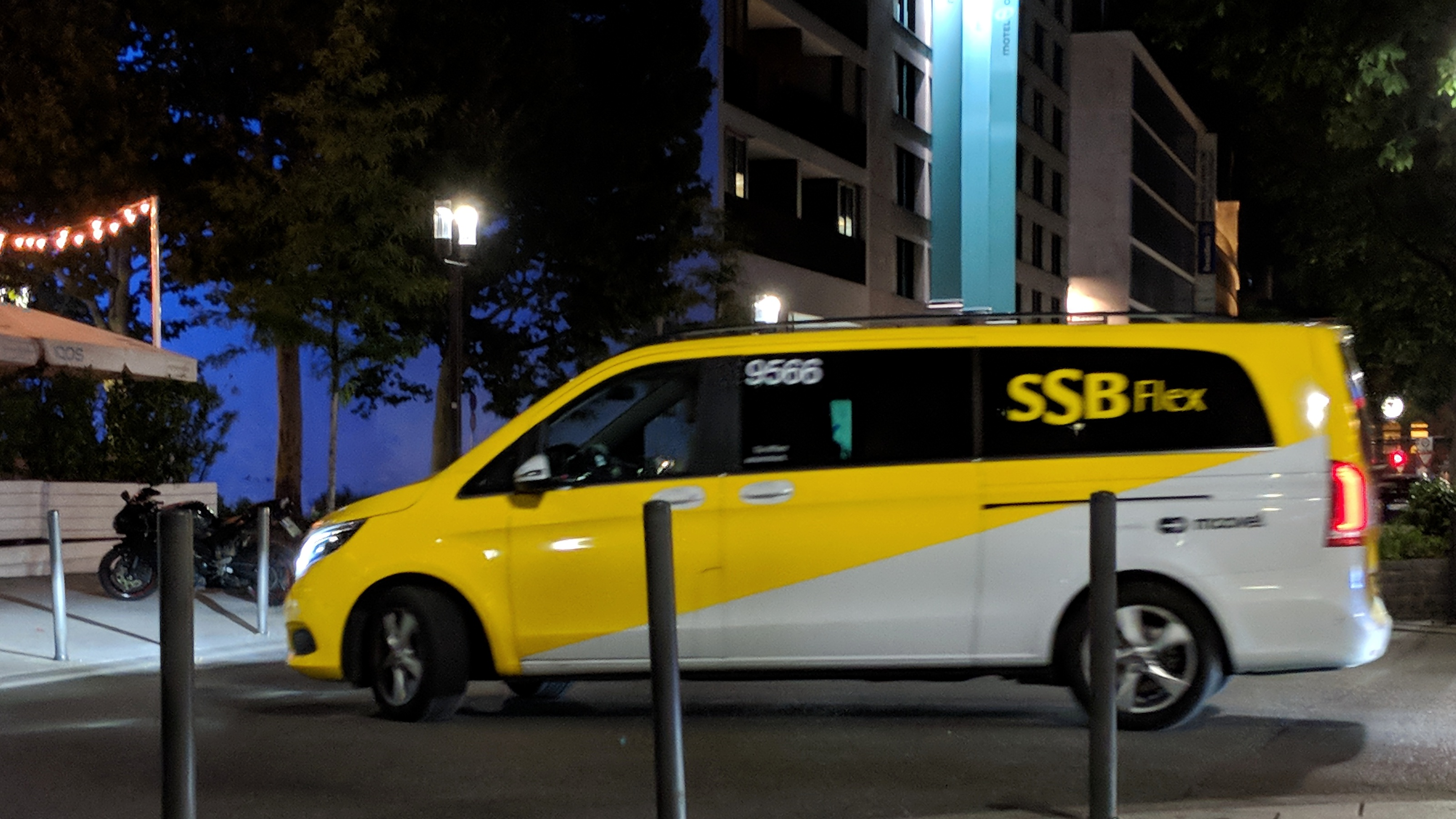
Mercedes-Benz V-Class for SSB Flex

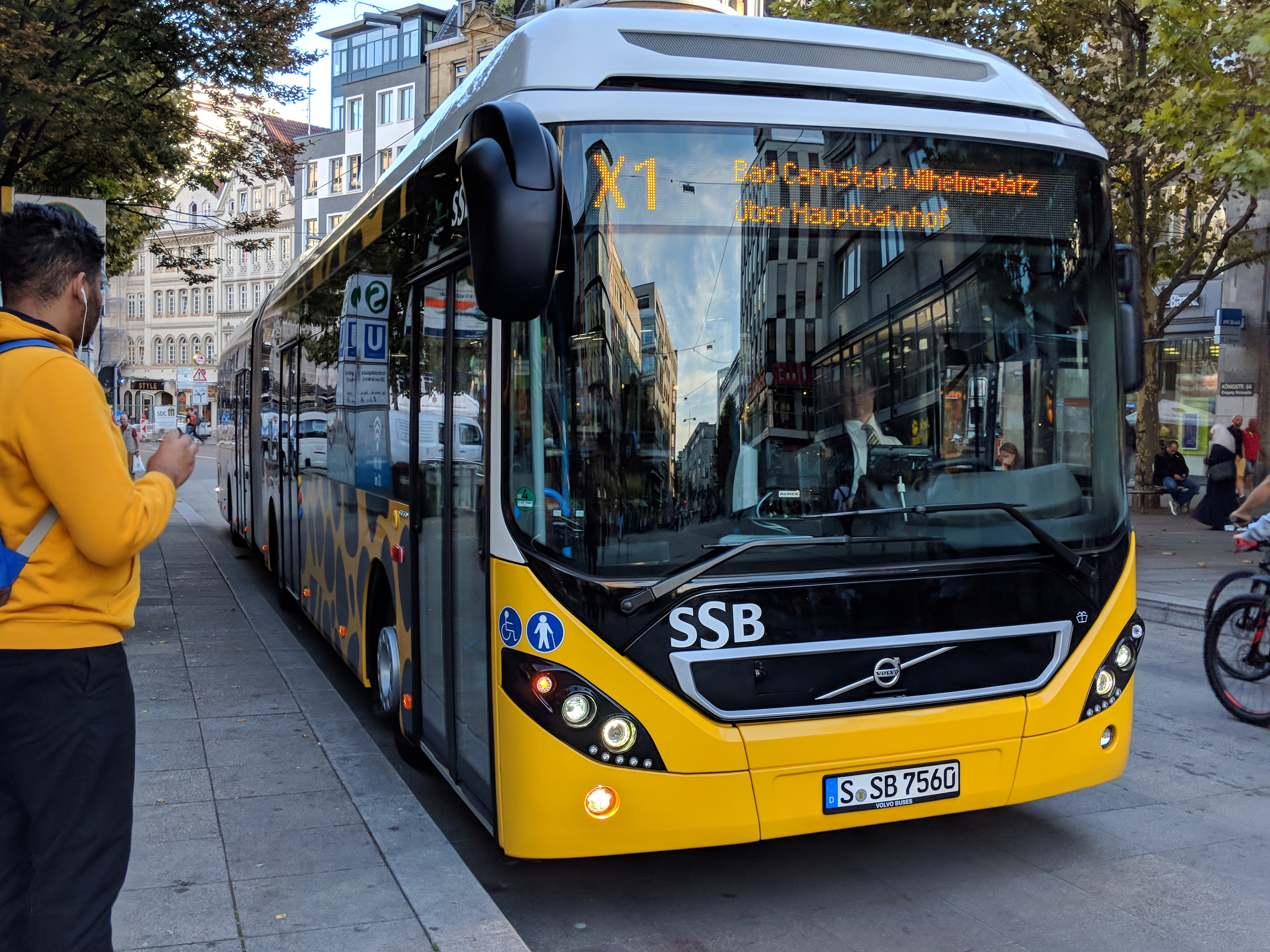
Volvo articulated bus on the X1

Stuttgarter Straßenbahnen AG (SSB) is the principal public transport operating company in the German city of Stuttgart. The SSB is a member of the Verkehrs- und Tarifverbund Stuttgart (VVS), and operates the Stuttgart Stadtbahn, bus lines, a rack railway, and a funicular railway.

== Colour ==
Since the coat of arms of Stuttgart shows a black, rampant horse on a yellow or golden field, the Stuttgart Stadtbahn as well as all the buses come in yellow with black window frames.

== Stuttgart Stadtbahn ==
The Stadtbahn, a (light rail system), covers 17 lines. The system is operated with 164 cars, operates on standard gauge track, and is electrified at 750 volts DC.

== Tram system used until December 2007 ==
The last remaining tram line (15) ceased to operate on 8 December 2007 and was replaced by the Stadtbahn line U15 on the same day. The old tram system was operated by 38 cars of type GT4. Unlike the city's light rail system, the tram system operated on 1,000 mm (3 ft 3 3/8 in) metre gauge track. The conversion of tram lines to light rail lines was thus a complex procedure, and necessitates dual gauge track where both systems operated over the same track.

There are also two heritage tram lines, which are operated on the second Sunday of each month and on the last Saturday of each month by the Stuttgarter Historische Straßenbahnen society with trams from the Tram Museum of Stuttgart.

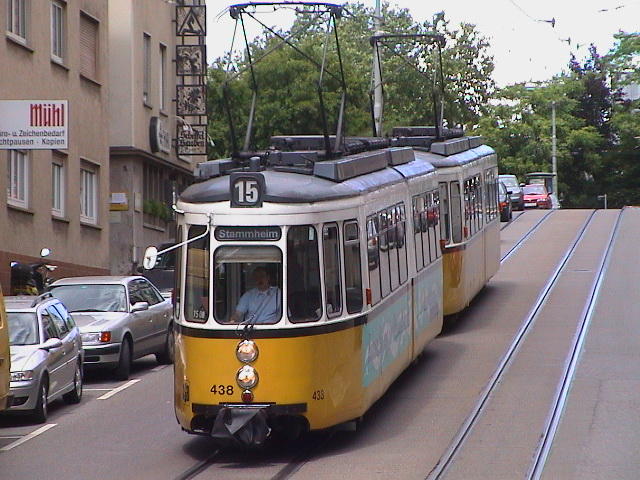
Tram line 15 in the Haußmannstraße. The model GT4 was operated from 1959 to 2007.

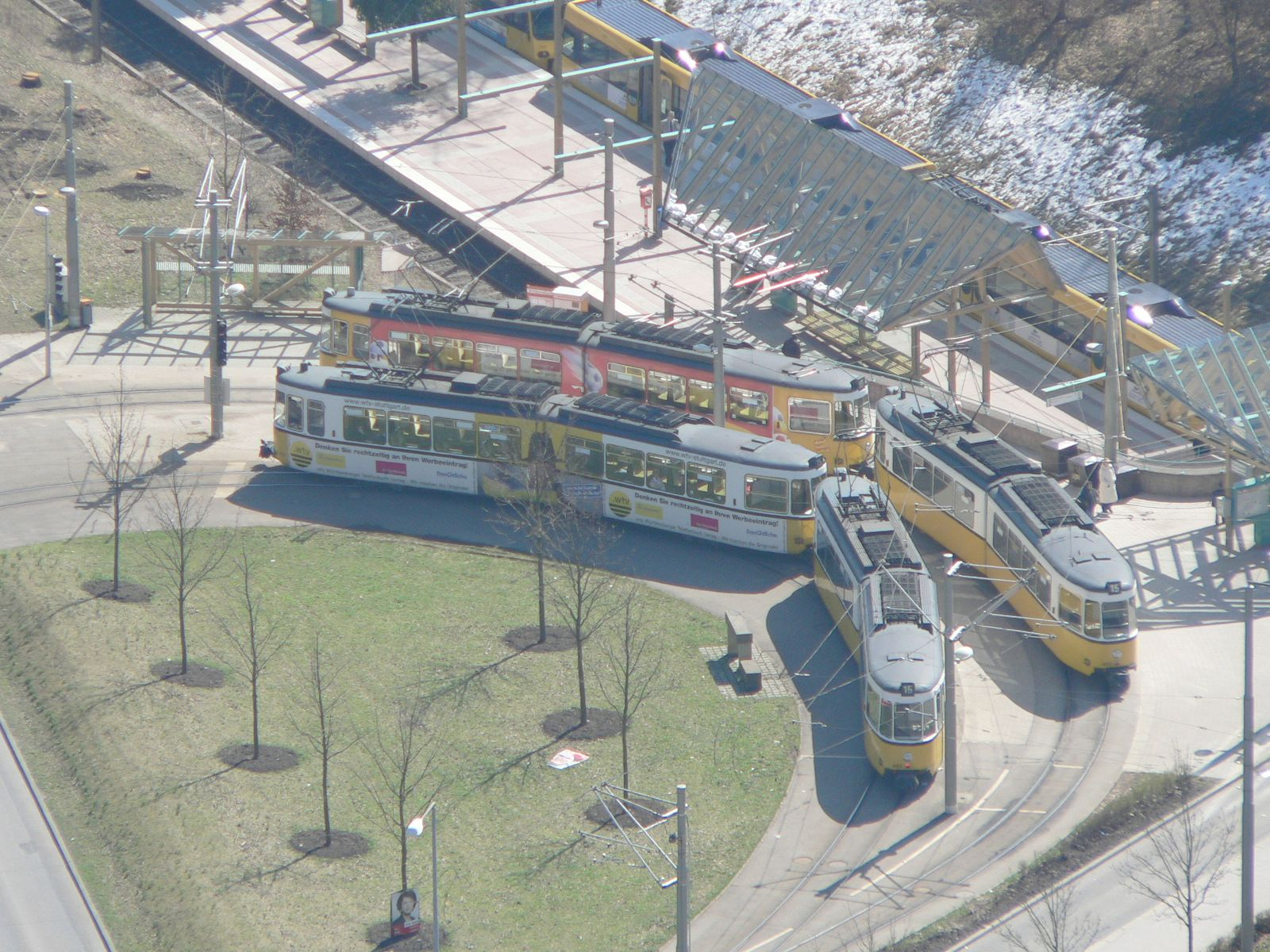
Two trams of model GT4 in the terminal loop “Ruhbank” at the Fernsehturm.

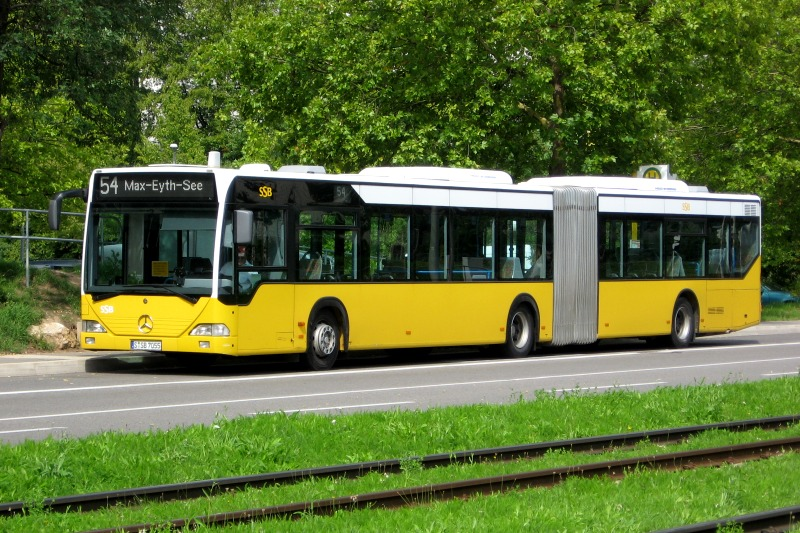
A Stuttgart low floor articulated bus

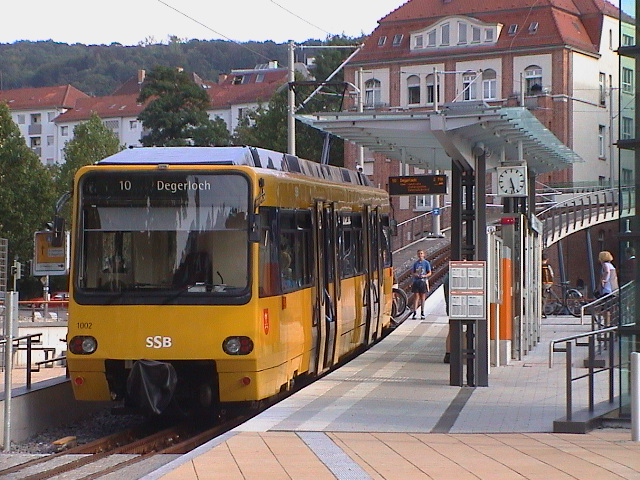
The rack railway

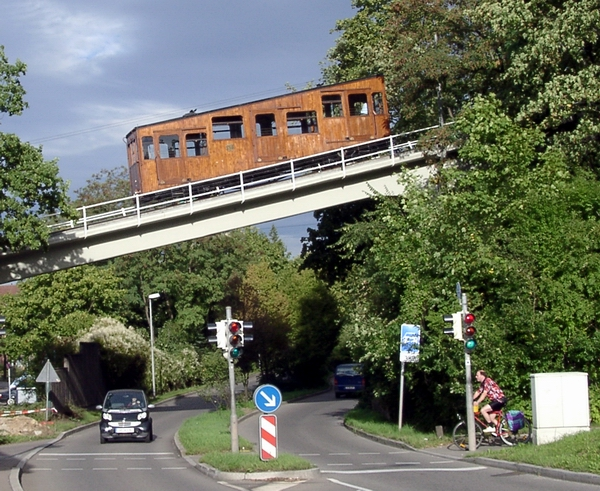
The funicular railway

== Bus system ==
The bus network of the SSB covers Stuttgart and many neighbouring cities, with 54 different routes. Bus routes are operated by both SSB itself, and by other operators under contract to SSB.

SSB's own bus fleet consists of approximately 250 vehicles, of which about 160 are articulated buses. The buses are predominantly of Mercedes-Benz manufacture, although there are 36 made by MAN in the years 2001 and 2002. The bus fleet is operated from depots and yards at Gaisburg, Möhringen, Sielmingen, and Zuffenhausen.

== Other modes ==
Besides the light rail and bus networks, the SSB operates two more unusual forms of transport:

- The Stuttgart Rack Railway connects the urban districts of Stuttgart South (Marienplatz) and Degerloch (Albplatz). This line operates as SSB route 10, and connects light rail lines U1 and U14 at Marienplatz with lines U5, U6 and U8 at Albplatz.
- The Standseilbahn Stuttgart, a funicular railway, links Südheimer Platz with the Degerloch forest cemetery. This line, which operates as SSB route 20, connects with light rail lines U1 and U14 at Südheimer Platz.

== Fares and ticketing ==
The SSB is part of the regional transport cooperative, the Verkehrs- und Tarifverbund Stuttgart (VVS), which coordinates tickets and fares among all transport operators in the metropolitan area. Besides the SSB's Stadtbahn, tram and bus networks, this coordination includes the Stuttgart S-Bahn, operated by a subsidiary of Deutsche Bahn AG (DBAG), and DBAG's RegionalBahn regional train services within the VVS area.
