= Maschinenfabrik Esslingen GT4 =

Tram type used mainly in Stuttgart, Germany

GT4
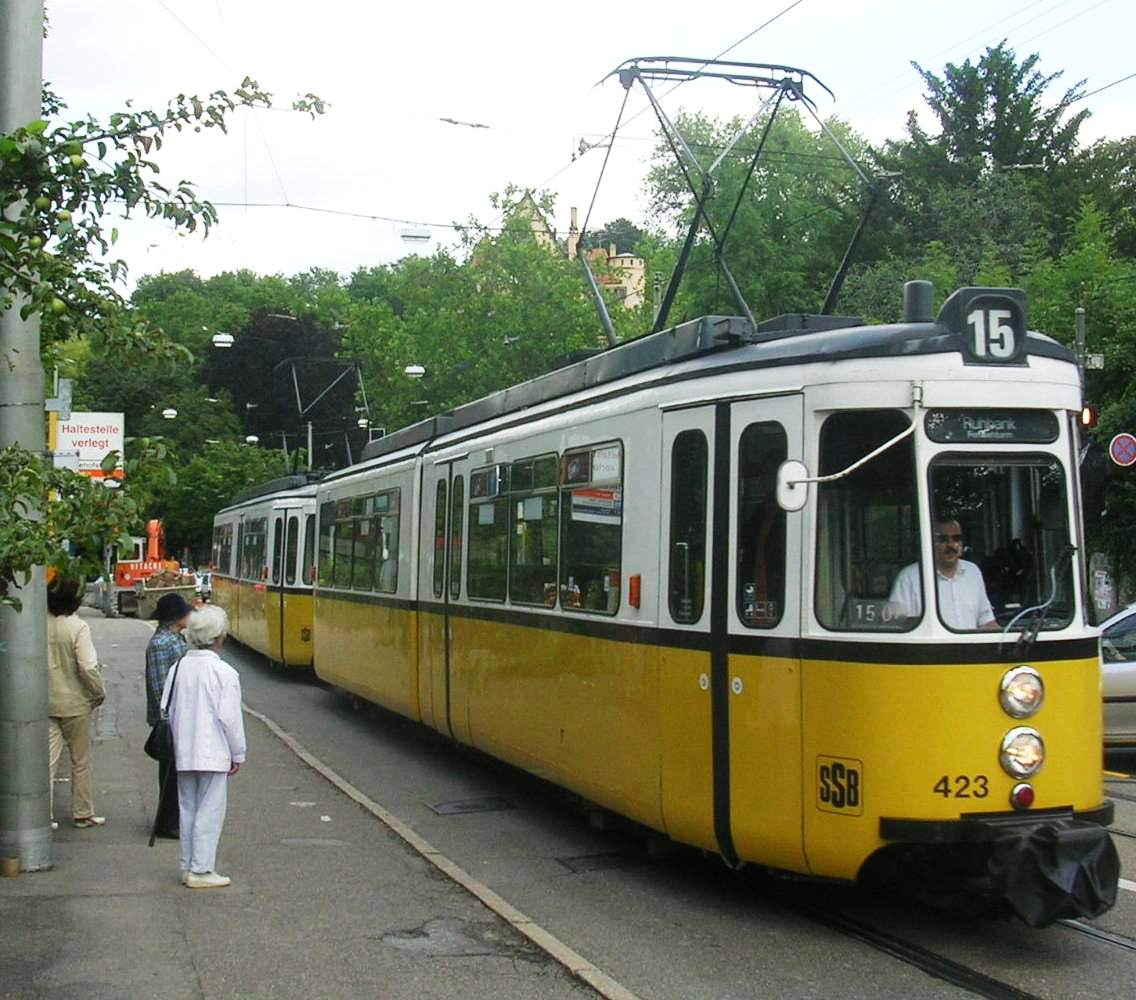
- GT4 in Stuttgart
- Manufacturer: Maschinenfabrik Esslingen
- Constructed: 1959–1965
- Number built: 380
- Capacity: 38–41 (seated); 121–125 (standing)

Specifications
- Train length: 18,800 mm (61 ft 8 in) over couplers
- Width: 2,200 mm (7 ft 3 in)
- Height: 3,160 mm (10 ft 4 in)
- Doors: 3
- Maximum speed: 60 km/h (37 mph)
- Weight: 19,500 kg (43,000 lb)
- Power output: 2 x 90 kW motors; 2 x 125 kW motors (Neunkirchen)
- AAR wheel arrangement: (1A)' (A1)'
- Bogies: 2
- Track gauge: 1,000 mm (3 ft 3 3/8 in) metre gauge; 1,435 mm (4 ft 8 1/2 in) standard gauge (Neunkirchen)

The GT4 (from German: Gelenktriebwagen 4-achsig, which translates as 4-axle articulated tramcar) is an articulated tram vehicle built by Maschinenfabrik Esslingen from 1959 until 1965.

== History ==
380 GT4 trams were produced of which 350 were delivered to the Stuttgarter Strassenbahnen, the public transport operator of Stuttgart. The remaining 30 vehicles were delivered to Freiburg (19), Neunkirchen (Saar) (8) and Reutlingen (3). The 350 Stuttgart vehicles were uni-directional, had three double-doors, and were built to metre gauge. The cars for Freiburg and Reutlingen also metre-gauge, but were bi-directional. The Neunkirchen cars also bi-directional and were built to standard gauge. They also had four powered axles whereas the standard variant had only two.

In 2026 the only operator in regular service of GT4 is CTP, the public transport company in Iași, Romania,with a total of 47 vehicles.

== Technical specifications ==
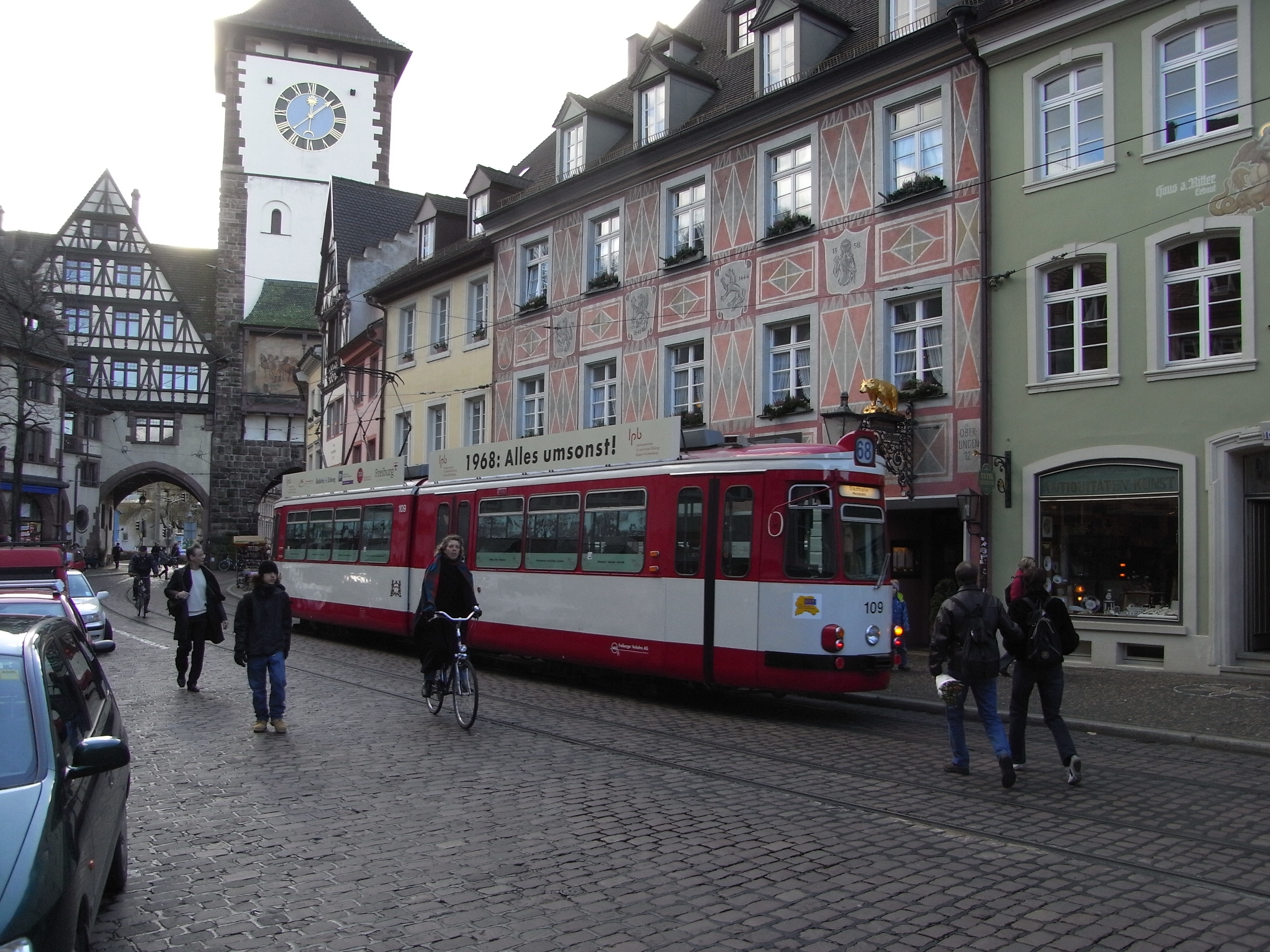
Bi-directional GT4 tram in Freiburg.

The GT4 was developed because the longer six-axle articulated trams with Jacobs bogies, such as the GT6, were not suitable for the Stuttgart network, which had a large number of sharp curves and steep gradients due to the city's hilly topography.

The design of articulation is unique: both bogies are connected by an underframe, upon which the two halves of the tram body rest. When the tram drives around a curve, the underframe prevents the body from overhanging the inside of the curve, allowing tighter clearances and more flexibility than a non-articulated tram. On all except the Neunkirchen vehicles only the inner axle on each bogie is powered, with two thirds of the vehicle's weight resting on the powered axles.

The bi-directional variants have a second driver's cab and additional side doors, unlike the uni-directional models.

== Trailers ==
The GT4 can operate in multiple. In later years, some vehicles were only used as powered trailers therefore had no modernised driver's cab. This was the case for a total of 180 vehicles, 24 from the first series, 30 from the second series, 98 from the third and fourth series and eight in the fifth series.

== Sale to other cities ==
As the metre-gauge tram network in Stuttgart was converted to the standard-gauge Stadtbahn system from 1985 onwards, some surplus GT4 cars were sold to other cities:

- Arad (Romania) - 46 cars
- Iași (Romania) - 108 cars
- Augsburg - 40 cars (23 cars later resold to Iași)
- Halberstadt - 13 cars, 10 ex-Stuttgart and 3 ex-Freiburg
- Halle - 40 cars, ex-Stuttgart (27 cars later resold to Iași)
- Nordhausen - 12 cars (3 cars later resold to Iași in 2012)
- Ulm - three cars ex-Reutlingen and 14 cars ex-Stuttgart
- Fukui via Kōchi (Japan) - two cars joined into one, see details below
- Brandenburg an der Havel - 3 cars, ex-Freiburg

Some vehicles were destroyed or damaged beyond repair during a great fire in the Feuerbach depot in Stuttgart in 1986.

One Iași tram was rebuilt in 2013 by Electroputere VFU as type GT4M.

The bi-directional cars originally delivered to Reutlingen (59, 60 and 61) were later sold to Ulm. The Ulm workshop rebuilt them to uni-directional cars, numbered 11, 12 and 13 and entering service in 1982-1984.

In 1989 two uni-directional cars from Stuttgart (SSB 714 and 735) were exported to Japan. The front sections of the two trams were joined together as one bi-directional vehicle, and the back sections were scrapped. The vehicle had no additional doors, however having only two doors on each side suited the Japanese tram fare collecting system. The car was also regauged to fit the 1,067 mm (3 ft 6 in) gauge. The car was initially used by Tosaden Kōtsū and since April 2014 has been operated on the Fukui Railway as their type F10 tram under the nickname "Retram" (レトラム).

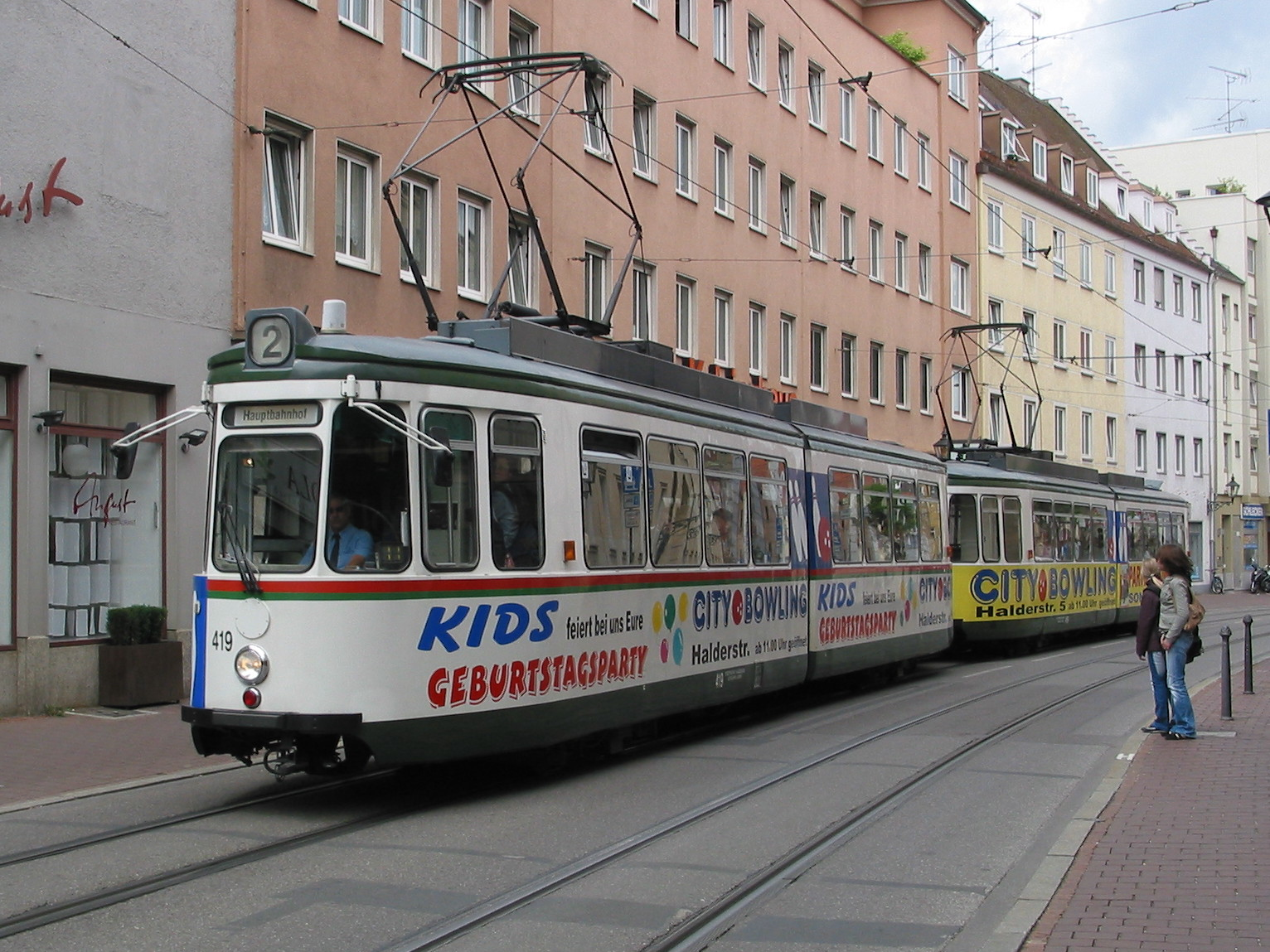
Augsburg GT4 419

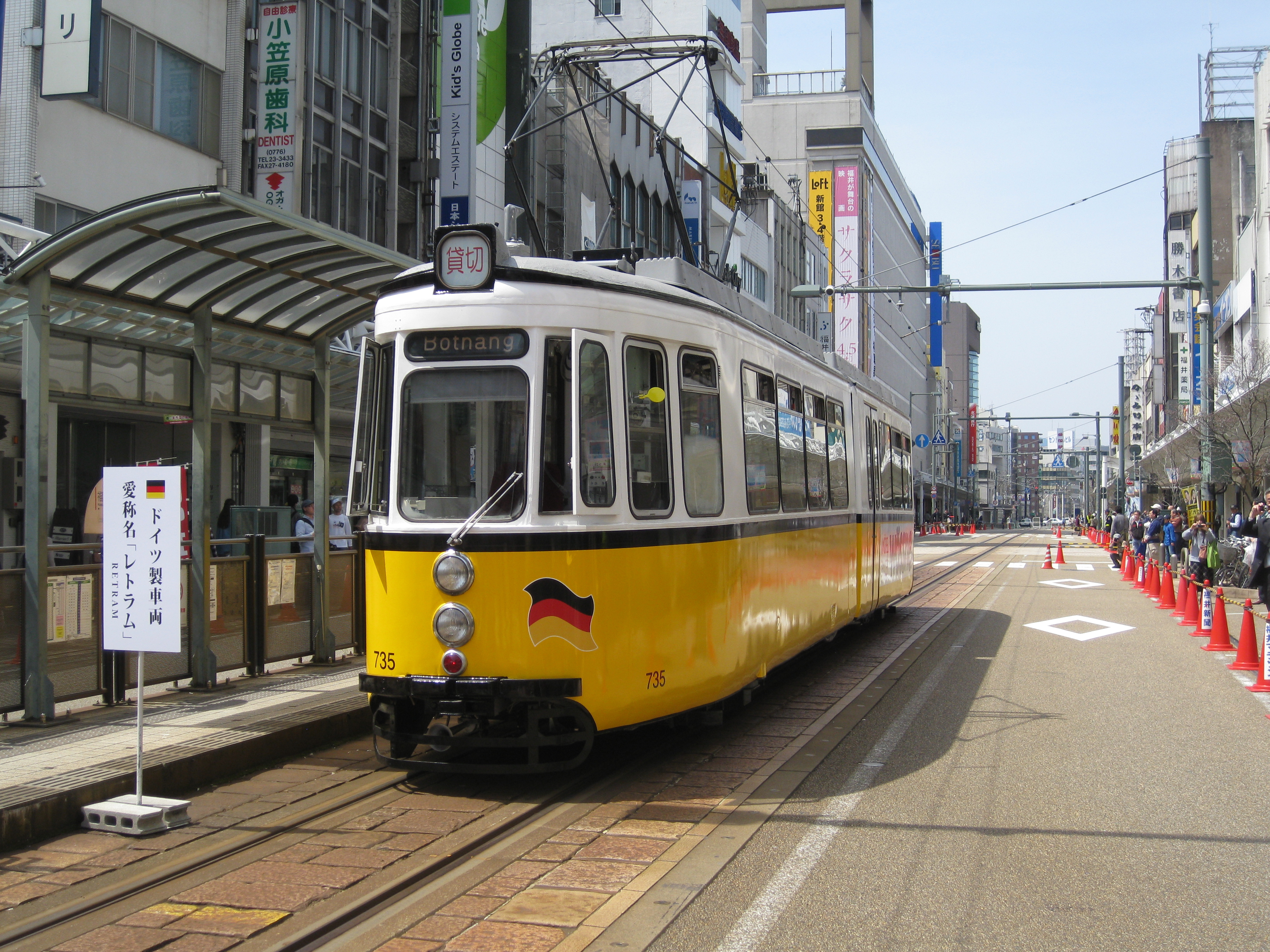
Fukui Railway Type F10 (SSB 714 & 735) at their departure ceremony in Fukui Railway

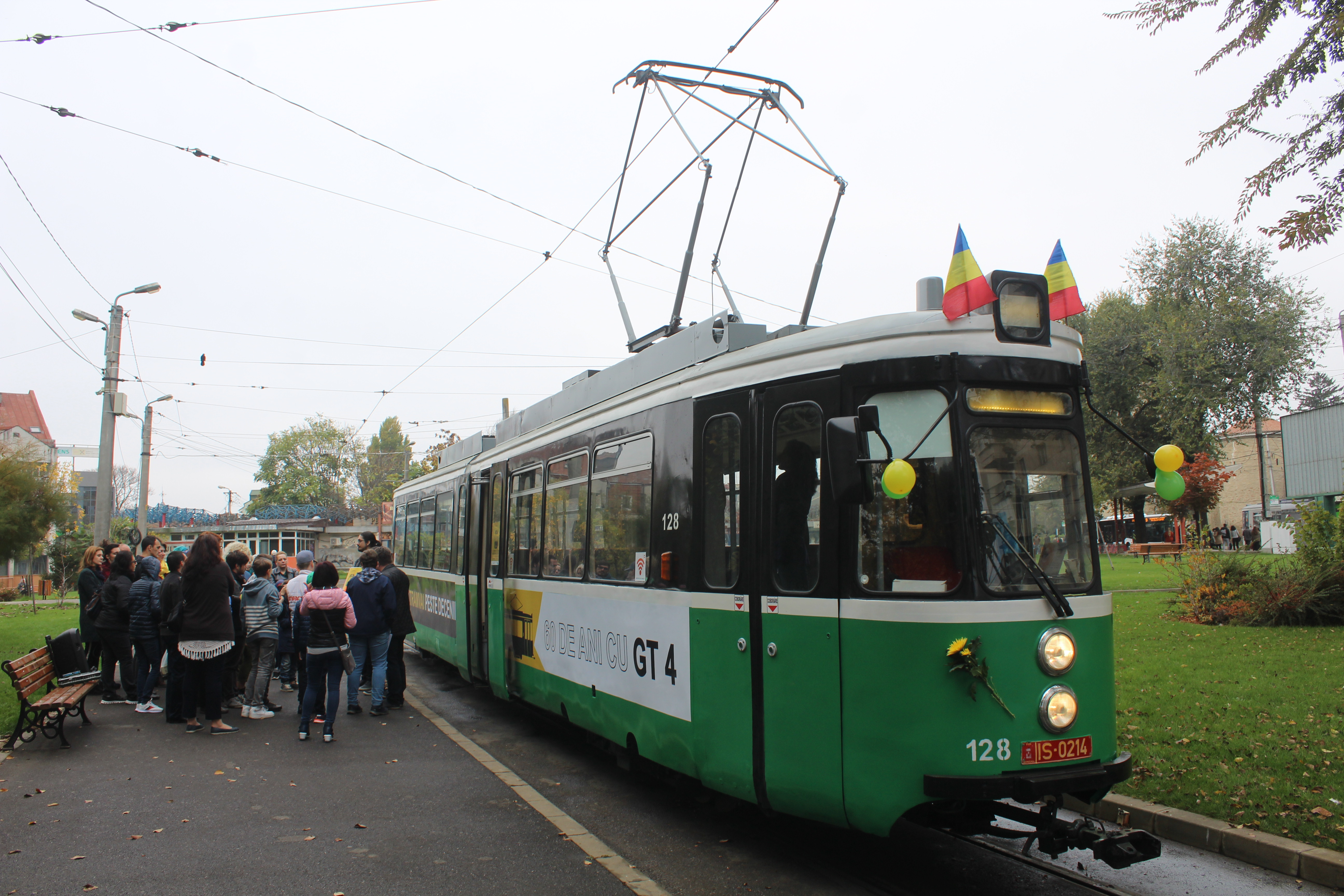
Iași GT4 #128 at its 60th anniversary in 2019
