= Verkehrs- und Tarifverbund Stuttgart =

Transport cooperative in metropolitan Stuttgart, Germany

Verkehrs- und Tarifverbund Stuttgart GmbH
- Native name: Verkehrs- und Tarifverbund Stuttgart GmbH
- Type: GmbH
- Industry: Verkehrsverbund
- Founded: 22 December 1977
- Headquarters: Stuttgart
- Key people: Thomas Hachenberger; Horst Stammler
- Number of employees: 83 (2017)
- Website: www.vvs.de

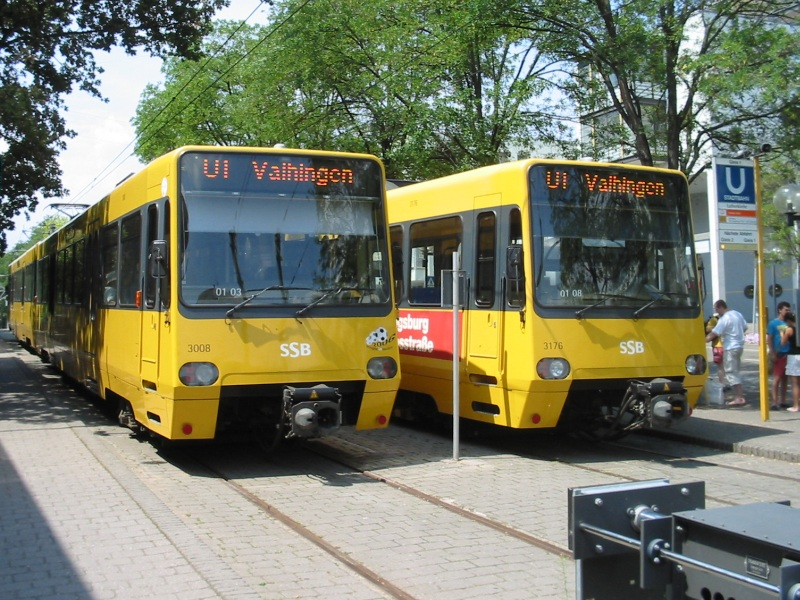
Stuttgart Stadtbahn

The Verkehrs- und Tarifverbund Stuttgart GmbH (VVS; English: Stuttgart Transport and Tariff Association LLC) is a transport association that coordinates the local public transport in Stuttgart, the capital of Baden-Württemberg, as well as in the neighbouring districts of Böblingen, Esslingen, Ludwigsburg and Rems-Murr, and parts of Göppingen and Ostalbkreis. The network ensures uniform conditions of carriage and fare regulations as well as a coordinated timetable. It cooperates with the administrative districts and municipalities as well as the Verband Region Stuttgart.

== History ==
The VVS-Gemeinschaftsstarif was introduced on 1 October 1978 when the Stuttgarter Vorortverkehr was replaced by the S-Bahn Stuttgart. Initially, it was a tariff community between Deutsche Bundesbahns (express trains, local trains, S-Bahn and train buses), the german post and almost all means of transport of Stuttgart trams (SSB). At the same time, SSB gave up its own fare; only on the airport bus route A, which was operated until 1993, did SSB's own fare apply until the end. Outside the SSB network at that time, the following railway lines were integrated at the beginning:

- Stuttgart-Bad Cannstatt-Schorndorf
- Waiblingen-Backnang
- Backnang-Ludwigsburg
- Ludwigsburg-Bietigheim-Bissingen
- Stuttgart Hbf-Böblingen

On 1 July 1982 the VVS-transitional tariff was introduced. This enabled passengers to use not only DB and SSB services, but also the buses and trains of around 40 private transport companies with a monthly ticket.

On October 1, 1993, the transitional tariff was abolished and the community tariff was extended to the entire area of the four districts surrounding Stuttgart. From then on, regional trains could no longer be used with composite tickets only up to the end point of the S-Bahn, but beyond that to the last station before the district border.

On January 1, 2014, the Filstalbahn in the District Göppingen to the Geislingen station as well as the railway line Stuttgart-Bad Cannstatt-Aalen to the Lorch station in the Ostalbkreis were integrated into the VVS tariff.

On 1 January 2016, the cities of Nagold and Altensteig in the Calw district were also integrated into the VVS tariff.

On 1 January 2020, the Ergenzingen railway station was integrated into the VVS tariff.

== Key figures ==
Passenger development

The VVS traffic area covers 3012 square kilometres with a population of around 2.4 million. In this area, 17 regional trainlines, seven S-Bahn lines, 19 Stadtbahnlinien operate (including two special lines that only run to special events), the Zahnradbahn Stuttgart, the Standseilbahn Stuttgart as well as 359 bus lines, three trolleybus lines (see trolleybus Esslingen am Neckar) and 28 night bus lines.

The VVS operates 146 S-Bahn railway cars, 164 light rail vehicles, 26 diesel railcars, nine trolleybuses, three rack railcars, two funicular railcars and about 1300 buses.

== Tariff ==
There is a uniform tariff for the entire area of the Stuttgart transport association. The system comprises one tariff zone for the city of Stuttgart (zone 1) and seven further tariff zones (zones 2 to 8), which are arranged in a ring around the Stuttgart city area.

The tariff reform in April 2019 replaced the 52 old tariff zones - most of which have existed since 1978 - with eight new tariff zones. Among other things, the former core zone 10 was merged with the ring zone 20; since then, the entire Stuttgart city area has been in one zone. Likewise, the outermost ring zones 60 to 69 and 70 to 75 as well as 77 and 78 were merged into the new ring zone 5. As the prices for the zones remained constant, some journeys in the tariff association became cheaper. The cost of the tariff reform 2019 was estimated at about 42 million euros per year. In April 2019, the number of trips increased by 4.1 percent year-on-year, the number of subscribers by 6.8 percent. In the previous months, the increase was between 1.0 and 1.3 percent.

== Tickets ==
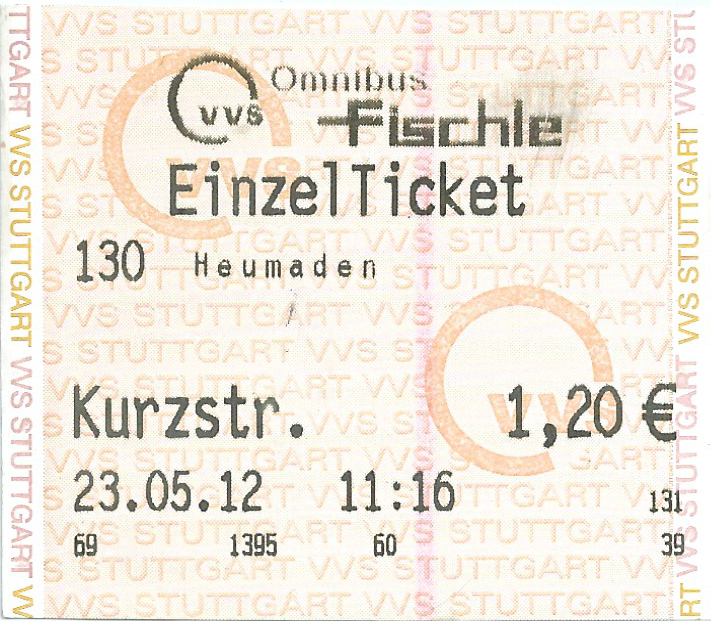
VVS ticket

VVS tickets are valid in Stuttgart and the districts of Böblingen, Esslingen, Ludwigsburg and Rems-Murr for all suburban trains, local trains (RB, RE, IRE), light rail, buses (except line X3), the rack railway and the cable car. In inbound and outbound traffic, the VVS tariff also applies in individual neighbouring towns such as Beilstein or Lorch. In the district of Göppingen, the VVS tariff has been applied since 2014 for journeys by local trains from or to the VVS area. The use of buses in the district of Göppingen is possible with individual or group day tickets of the VVS in the price level network, but not with VVS single tickets. The complete integration of the existing Filsland network into the VVS is scheduled for 1 January 2021.

Regular single tickets, 4-trip tickets, short-haul tickets, individual and group day tickets as well as different variants of monthly and annual tickets can be purchased. Single tickets and 4-trip tickets for children from 6 to 14 years of age cost about half the normal price, they can also be used to take a dog with you or as a supplement for 1st class.

Single tickets are valid for a maximum of three hours for a journey to the destination, changing trains and interruptions are permitted. The short-distance ticket is valid on suburban trains and local trains for a journey to the next stop, whereby the distance travelled may not exceed five kilometres, on light railways and buses to the third stop after boarding without changing trains or interrupting the journey.

In several cities there are reduced price day tickets that can only be used in the respective city area.

Ticket vending machines can be found at all S-Bahn, light rail and local train stops, and in the SSB area also at bus stops with higher traffic volumes. Payment with the bus driver is mostly only possible with cash, only on the lines of the SVE in Esslingen and of LVL Jäger in Ludwigsburg. The possibility of (contactless) payment by girocard is offered since 2018. With VVS Mobil, the transport association provides its own App for smartphones, which, in addition to timetable information, also enables the purchase of Mobile phone tickets. VVS tickets can also be purchased via the apps SSB Move, Moovel and the DB Navigator. The mobile phone tickets are partly discounted compared to buying them from a ticket machine or the bus driver. Tickets for 4 persons must be validated before departure. In the case of S-Bahn and local trains, the validators are located on the platform or at the entrances, in the case of light rail and buses, they are in the vehicle. All other tickets purchased from ticket machines or from the bus driver are valid immediately without validation.

== Transport companies in the VVS ==
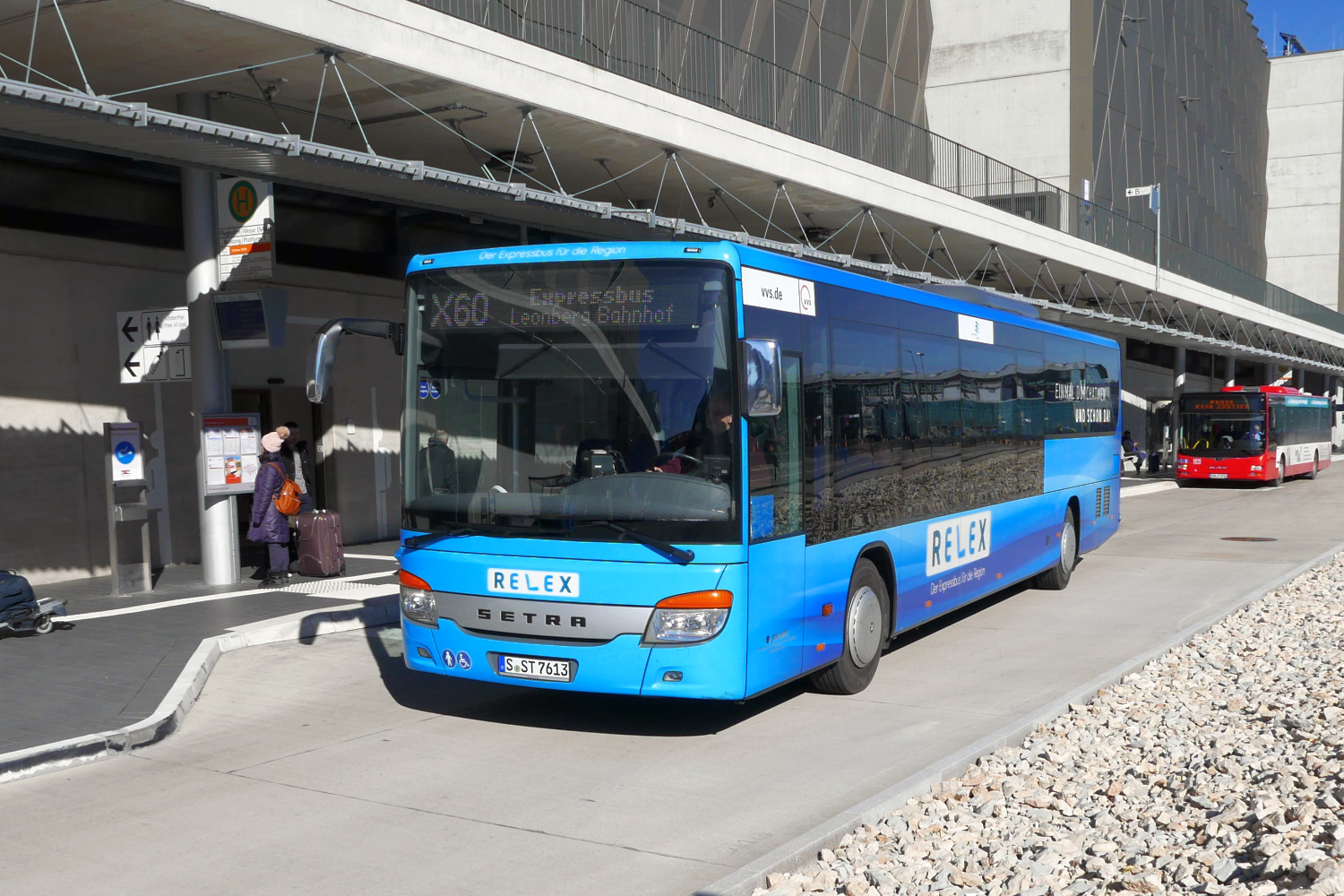
Buses at the Stuttgart Airport

The transport services are provided by about 40 companies. On some bus lines, subcontractors not listed here also operate, unless they also operate their own lines in the VVS.

- Abellio
- Bader Reisen
- Dannenmann
- Däuble
- DB Regio
  - DB ZugBus Regionalverkehr Alb-Bodensee (RAB)
  - Regiobus Stuttgart (RBS)
  - Regionalbusverkehr Südwest (RVS)
  - Omnibus Müller (FMO)
- Eisemann
- Fischle & Schlienz
- Flattich
- Go-Ahead
- Hassler Reisen
- Haussmann & Bauer
- Kappus
- Knauss
- LVL Jäger
- Melchinger
- Omnibusverkehr Göppingen (OVG)
- Omnibusverkehr Kirchheim (OVK)
- Pflieger, Stadtverkehr Böblingen-Sindelfingen (SBS)
  - RVP
- Römer
- Schlienz-Tours
  - GR Omnibus
- Seitter
- Seiz Reisen
- Spillmann
- Städtischer Verkehrsbetrieb Esslingen am Neckar (SVE)
- Stadtwerke Herrenberg
- Stadtwerke Remseck am Neckar
- Stäbler
- Stuttgarter Straßenbahnen (SSB)
- Transdev
  - Omnibus-Verkehr Ruoff (OVR)
  - Württembergische Bus-Gesellschaft (WBG)
  - Württembergische Eisenbahn-Gesellschaft (WEG)
- Verkehrsbetriebe Nagoldtal (VBN)
- Wöhr Tours

== Line system in the VVS ==
Transportation	Line numbers	Area	Operator
RE, RB, IRE	RE…, RB…, IRE…	Stuttgart, District Böblingen, District Esslingen, District Ludwigsburg, Rems-Murr-Kreis, Lorch^{1}, District Göppingen^{1}	Abellio, DB Regio, Go-Ahead, RAB, WEG
S-Bahn	S1 – S6, S11, S60	Stuttgart, District Böblingen, District Esslingen, District Ludwigsburg, Rems-Murr-Kreis	DB Regio siehe S-Bahn Stuttgart
Stadtbahn (City railway)	U1 – U9, U11 – U17, U19	Stuttgart, Fellbach, Gerlingen, Leinfelden-Echterdingen, Ostfildern, Remseck	Stuttgarter Straßenbahnen see Stadtbahn Stuttgart
Zahnradbahn (Rack railway)	10	Stuttgart-Süd, Stuttgart-Degerloch	Stuttgarter Straßenbahnen see Zahnradbahn Stuttgart
Funicular railway (Funicular railway)	20	Stuttgart-Süd, Stuttgart-Degerloch	Stuttgarter Straßenbahnen see Standseilbahn Stuttgart
Bus	40 – 92, 99; N1 – N10; X1, X2, X7	Stuttgart, Fellbach, Filderstadt, Korntal, Leonberg, Neuhausen auf den Fildern, Nürtingen, Ostfildern-Scharnhausen, Sindelfingen, Wolfschlugen	Stuttgarter Straßenbahnen (Subcontractors: Fischle, GR Omnibus, Knisel, Schlienz-Tours, Seitter)
Trolleybus	101, 113, 118	Esslingen, Stuttgart-Obertürkheim	SVE
Bus	102 – 199; N12 – N22, N81, N89; X19	District Esslingen, Grafenberg^{1}, Römerstein-Donnstetten^{1}	Bader (Subunternehmer: Ganter), Fischle & Schlienz, FMO, GR Omnibus, Haussmann & Bauer, Melchinger, OVG, OVK, Schlienz-Tours, SVE, WBG (Subunternehmer: Fischer, Weissinger, Winkler)
Bus	201 – 393; N21, N24, N30, N31, N36	Rems-Murr-Kreis, Lorch^{1}, Mainhardt^{1}, Wüstenrot^{1}	Dannenmann, Eisemann, Fischle & Schlienz, FMO, Knauss, OVR, Römer, Schlienz-Tours
Bus	402 – 626; N40 – N58; X43, X46	District Ludwigsburg, Stuttgart-Stammheim, Stuttgart-Zuffenhausen, Stuttgart-Feuerbach, Beilstein^{1}	Flattich, FMO, LVL Jäger, RBS (Subunternehmer: Gross, Klingel, Zügel), Seiz Reisen, Spillmann, OVR, Stadtwerke Remseck am Neckar (Subunternehmer: Knisel), WBG (Subunternehmer: Ernesti, Gross, Schreiter, Seitter, Wöhr Tours)
Bus	94 (zukünftig 690)^{2} 631 – 794; N60 – N80; X74, X77	District Böblingen, Heimsheim^{1}, Tiefenbronn-Lehningen^{1}, Gechingen^{1}, Nagold^{1}, Rohrdorf^{1}, Ebhausen^{1}, Altensteig^{1}, Egenhausen^{1}, Rottenburg-Ergenzingen^{1}	Däuble, FMO, Kappus, Hassler, Pflieger, RAB, RVP, Seitter, Stäbler, Stadtwerke Herrenberg, VBN, Wöhr Tours
Bus	805 – 828	District Esslingen, östlicher District Böblingen, Dettenhausen^{1}, Walddorfhäslach^{1}	FMO (Subunternehmer: Kocher/Lutz, Thumm), Melchinger
Expressbus (Relex)	X10, X20, X60	District Esslingen, District Böblingen, Rems-Murr-Kreis, Stuttgart-Vaihingen	Schlienz-Tours

^{1} The VVS tariff applies only to journeys to or from the VVS area by the respective means of transport.

^{2} The Stuttgart trams have given up their bus routes, which run completely outside the Stuttgart city area, until 31 December 2018. These lines will therefore be renumbered from the two-digit SSB scheme to the three-digit district scheme, which has not yet been completely implemented.

The 300 range denotes lines in the former District Backnang, line numbers in the 600 range denote the no longer existing District Leonberg.
