= International Multilingual Research Journal =

- Discipline: Linguistics
- Language: English
- Edited by: Jeff MacSwan

Publication details
- History: 2007–present
- Publisher: Routledge
- Frequency: Quarterly

Standard abbreviations
- ISO 4: Int. Multiling. Res. J.

Indexing
- ISSN: 1931-3152 (print); 1931-3160 (web)
- OCLC no.: 243599692

Links
- Journal homepage; Online access; Online archive

The International Multilingual Research Journal is a peer-reviewed academic journal in linguistics and education, focusing on the study of multilingualism. The current editorial team consists of Editor-in Chief Jeff MacSwan, Associate Editors Deborah Palmer, Anna Mendoza, Bedrettin Yazan, and Luis Poza, and Editorial Assistant Katie Glanbock. The journal was established in 2007 with Terrence G. Wiley and Alfredo Artiles as founding editors.

== Abstracting and indexing ==
The journal is abstracted and indexed in: Linguistics and Language Behavior Abstracts and ERIC.
