= Terrence G. Wiley =

American linguist

- Born: San Pedro, Los Angeles, California, U.S.
- Education: BA, History; MA, Linguistics; MA, Asian Studies; Ph.D., Education
- Alma mater: California State University, Long Beach, University of Southern California
- Occupations: President & Professor
- Employer: Center for Applied Linguistics
- Known for: Involvement in literacy and applied linguistics research; President and CEO, Center for Applied Linguistics
- Title: President and CEO, Professor Emeritus

Terrence G. Wiley has was chief executive officer of the Center for Applied Linguistics (CAL) in Washington, D.C. (2010-2017), professor emeritus of educational policy studies and applied linguistics at Arizona State University, and a member of the college of education, graduate faculty at the University of Maryland.

== Biography ==
Wiley received his PhD in education from the University of Southern California. He holds master's degrees in linguistics and Asian studies and a bachelor's degree in history from California State University, Long Beach. He was executive dean of the Mary Lou Fulton Institute and Graduate School of Education and director of the division of educational leadership and policy at ASU prior to becoming president of CAL.

== Career ==
Wiley is the author/co-editor of 10 books and over 100 juried articles and book chapters. His work has focused on literacy and language diversity, Ebonics, bilingual education, heritage and community language education, history of language policy and politics, and the impacts of globalization and restrictive language policies. He was a visiting scholar at universities in China, Japan, India, South Africa, Chile, Israel, the United Kingdom, and in the US. He is the co-founder of two scholarly journals, Journal of Language, Identity, and Education and International Multilingual Research Journal. His recent books include Handbook on Heritage, Community, and Native American Language Education in the United States: Research, Policy and Practice.

== Selected works ==
- Wiley, T.G., Christian, D., Peyton, J., Moore, S., Liu, N. (Eds.) (2014). Handbook on Heritage, Community, and Native American Language Education in the United States: Research, Policy and Practice. London: Routledge.
- Borman, K., Wiley, T.G., Danzig, A., & García, D. (Co-Editors) (2014), Review of Research in Education, 38(1) (an American Educational Research Association, AERA, publication).
- Wiley, T.G., Lee, J.S., Rumberger, R. (Eds.) (2009). The Education of Language Minority Immigrants in the United States. Bristol, UK: Multilingual Matters, LTD.
- Wiley, T.G. (2005). Literacy and Language Diversity in the United States, Second Edition. Washington, DC & McHenry, IL: Center for Applied Linguistics & Delta Systems.
- Ramírez, J.D., Wiley, T.G., de Klerk, G. & Lee, E., & Wright, W. (Eds.) (2005). Ebonics in the Urban Education Debate, 2nd Edition. Clevedon, UK: Multilingual Matters, LTD.
- Wiley, T.G. (1996). Literacy and Language Diversity in the United States. Washington, DC & McHenry, IL: Center for Applied Linguistics & Delta Systems.
