= Stuttgart Tram Museum =

Museum in Stuttgart

Coordinates: 48.7993°N 9.2186°E

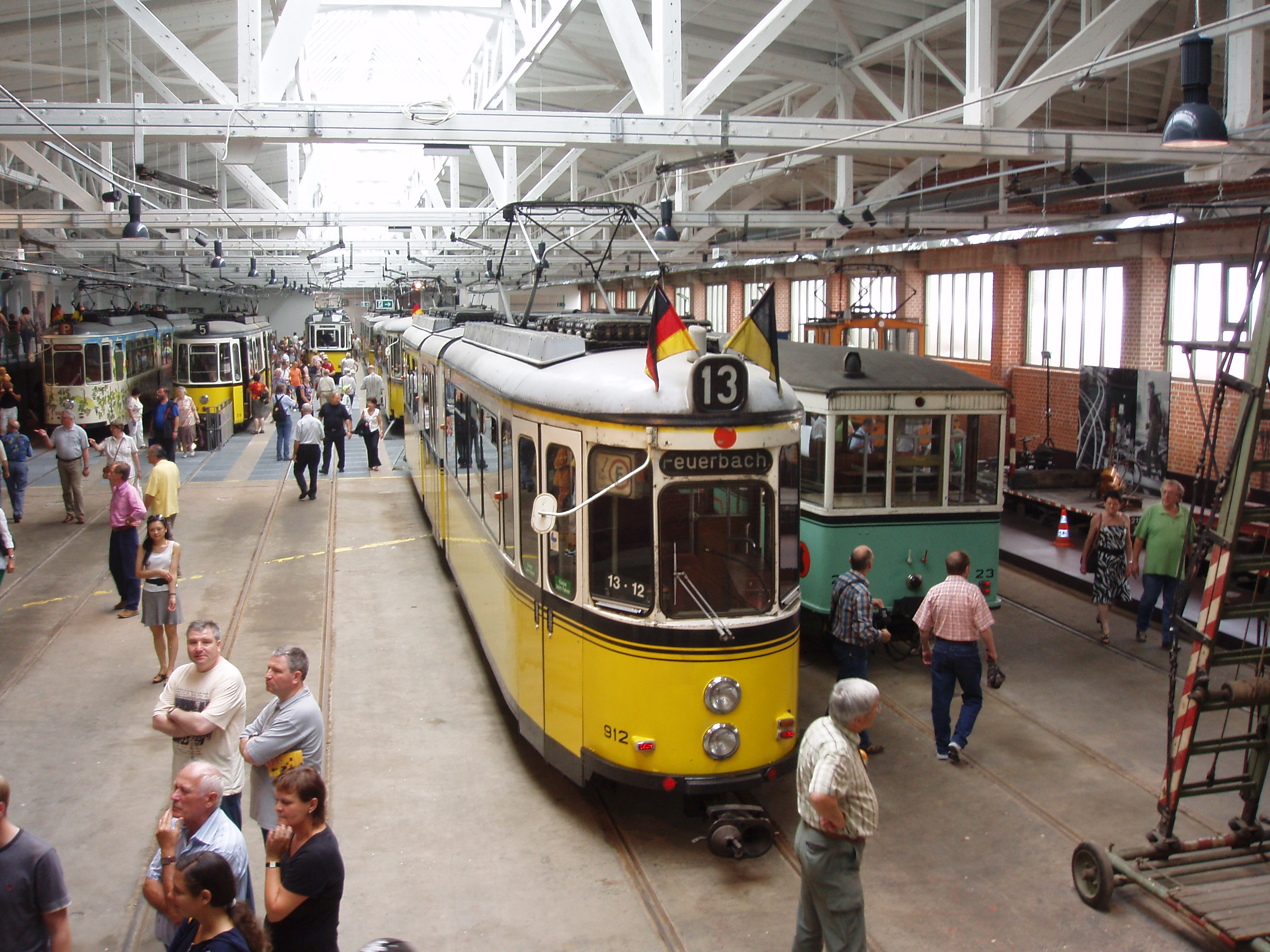
- The exhibition area of the Stuttgart tram museum on opening weekend
- Established: 2009
- Location: Veielbrunnenweg 3, Stuttgart, Germany
- Type: Tram museum
- Director: Dr. Nikolaus Niederich
- Owner: SHB e. V.
- Website: www.shb-ev.net/web/

The Stuttgart Tram Museum, originally opened under the name Straßenbahnwelt Stuttgart on July 4, 2009, is housed in a historic tram depot. In summer 2018, it was renamed Straßenbahnmuseum Stuttgart to commemorate the 150th anniversary of the Stuttgart Tramway Company (SSB -Stuttgarter Straßenbahnen).

== History ==
The Stuttgart Tram Museum, opened under the name Straßenbahnwelt Stuttgart on July 4, 2009. It is housed in a historic tram depot.

Its predecessor, the Straßenbahnmuseum Zuffenhausen, operated from 1995 to 2007 in a former tram hall located on Salzwiesenstraße in Zuffenhausen.

In summer 2018, it was renamed Straßenbahnmuseum Stuttgart to commemorate the 150th anniversary of the Stuttgart Tramway Company (SSB - Stuttgarter Straßenbahnen).

The museum attracts approximately 20,000 visitors annually. It offers both general and themed guided tours for groups of ten or more. Additionally, the exhibition area can be rented as an event venue.

== Collection ==
The core of the approximately 2,500-square-meter exhibition consists of 35 historic tram vehicles from Stuttgart and the surrounding area, a historic cog railway train, seven buses (mostly housed at the Gaisburg bus depot due to space constraints), two different halves of the Stadtbahn prototypes, as well as rail and road maintenance vehicles. These exhibits are located in the lower hall, which is open to the public. Some museum pieces that are still under restoration or have been relocated due to space limitations are stored in the upper hall and are only accessible as part of guided tours.

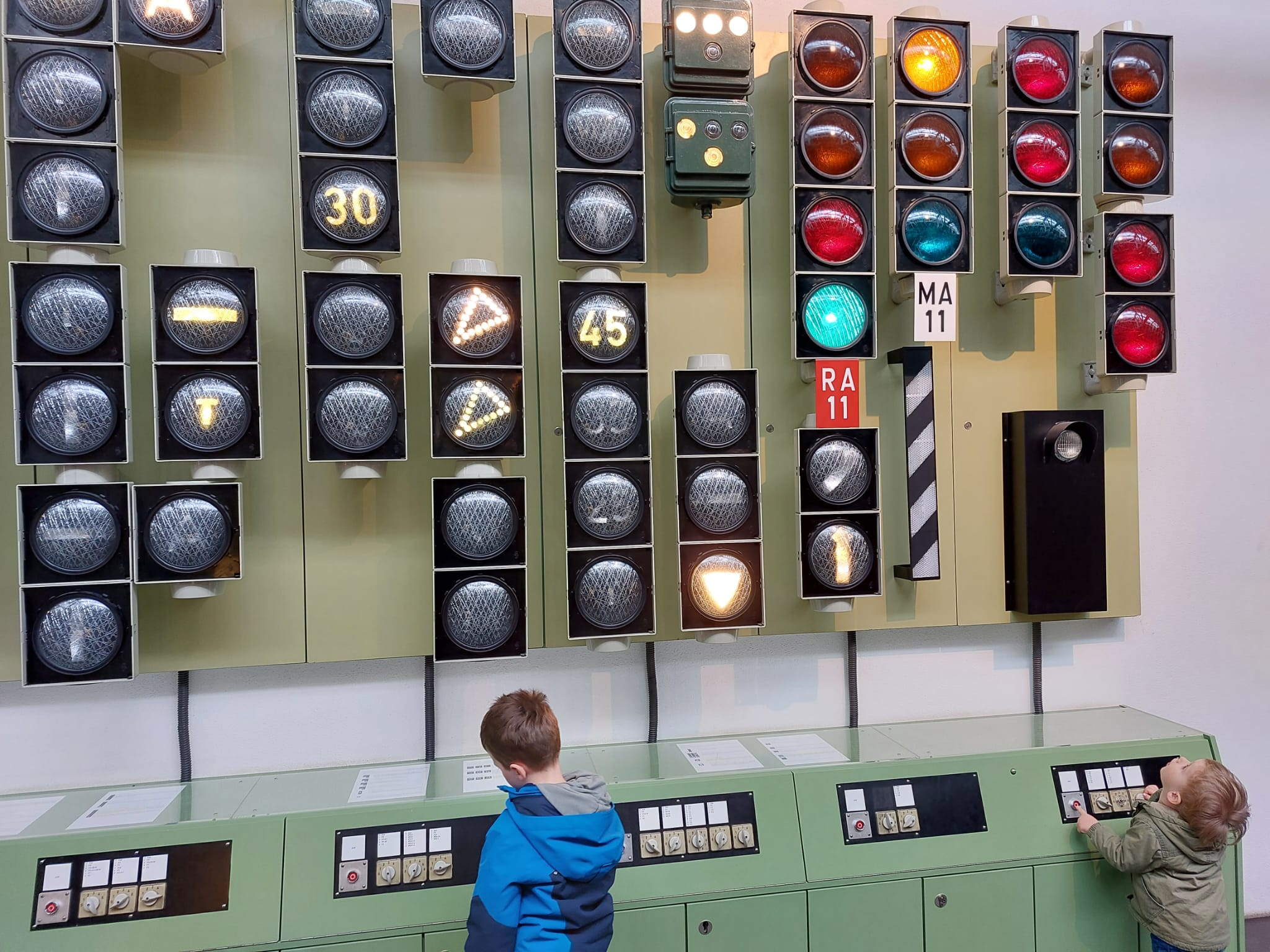
Interactive elements in the exhibition

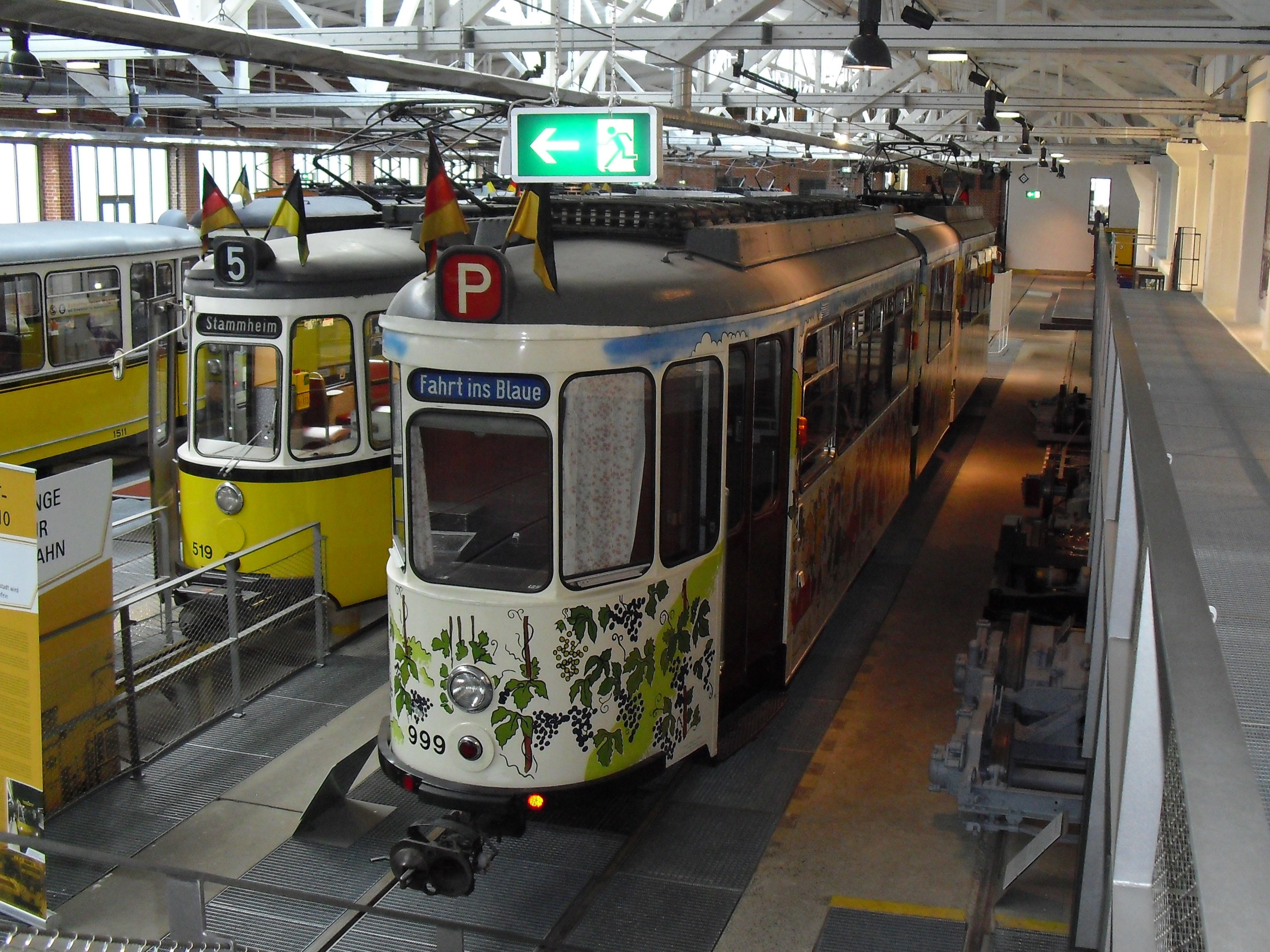
A view into the exhibition area in the lower hall

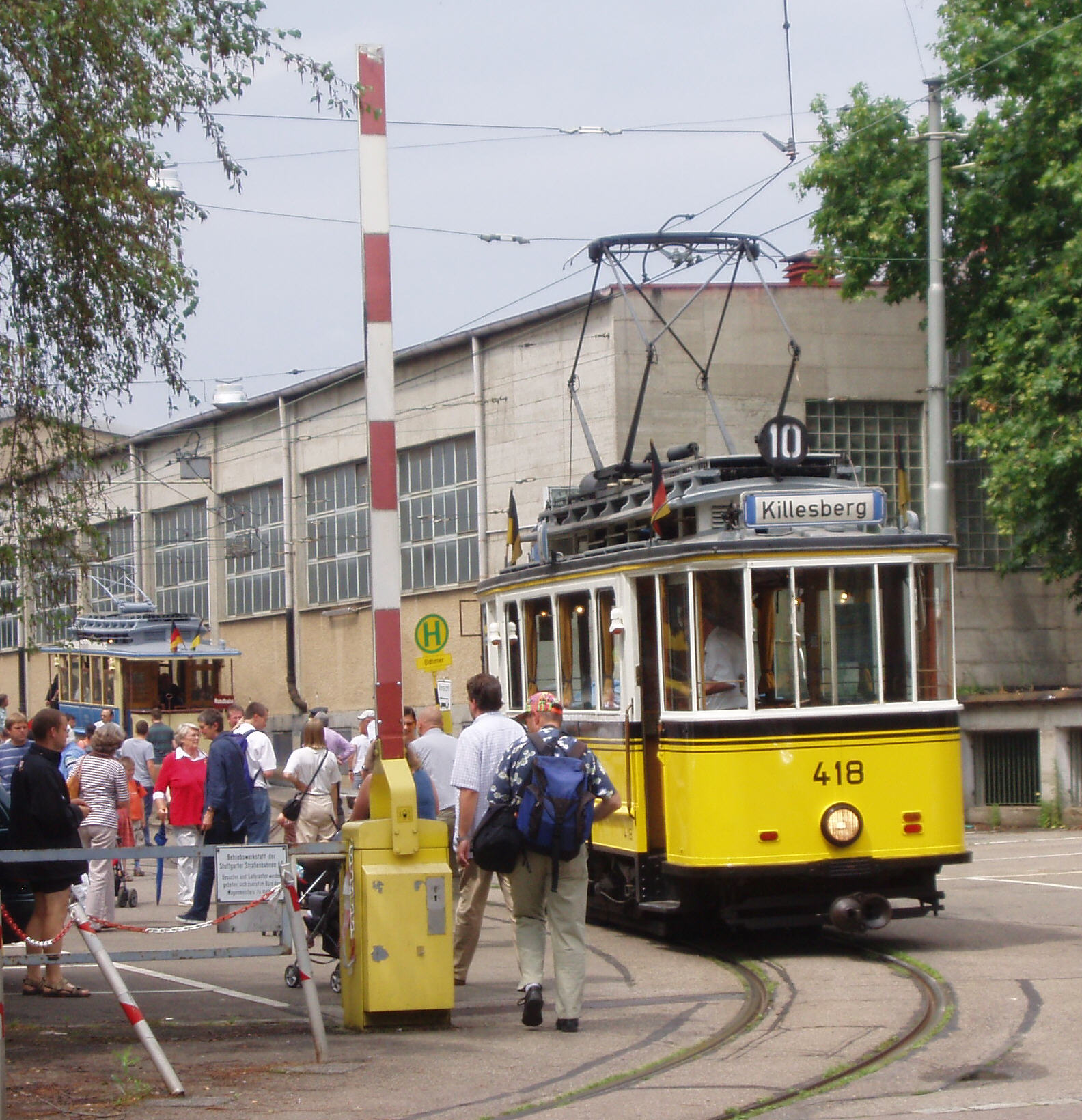
The rear ramp exit to the depot loop with the now-demolished extension of the upper hall

== Building ==
The museum building is located at Veielbrunnenweg 3 in Stuttgart and is housed in a historic tram depot, built in 1929, which is listed as a protected monument. The building consists of an upper and lower hall. The lower hall serves as the public exhibition area of the museum, while the upper hall, accessible only through guided tours, houses the operational vehicles used for historic tram operations.

Until the conversion of tram line 2 to a light rail system, the depot was still in regular operation. Later, the building was transformed into a museum. During this conversion, the rear track facilities of the depot were slightly reduced, and the rear extension of the upper hall, along with the ramp to the depot loop, was demolished. The ramp was later reconstructed.

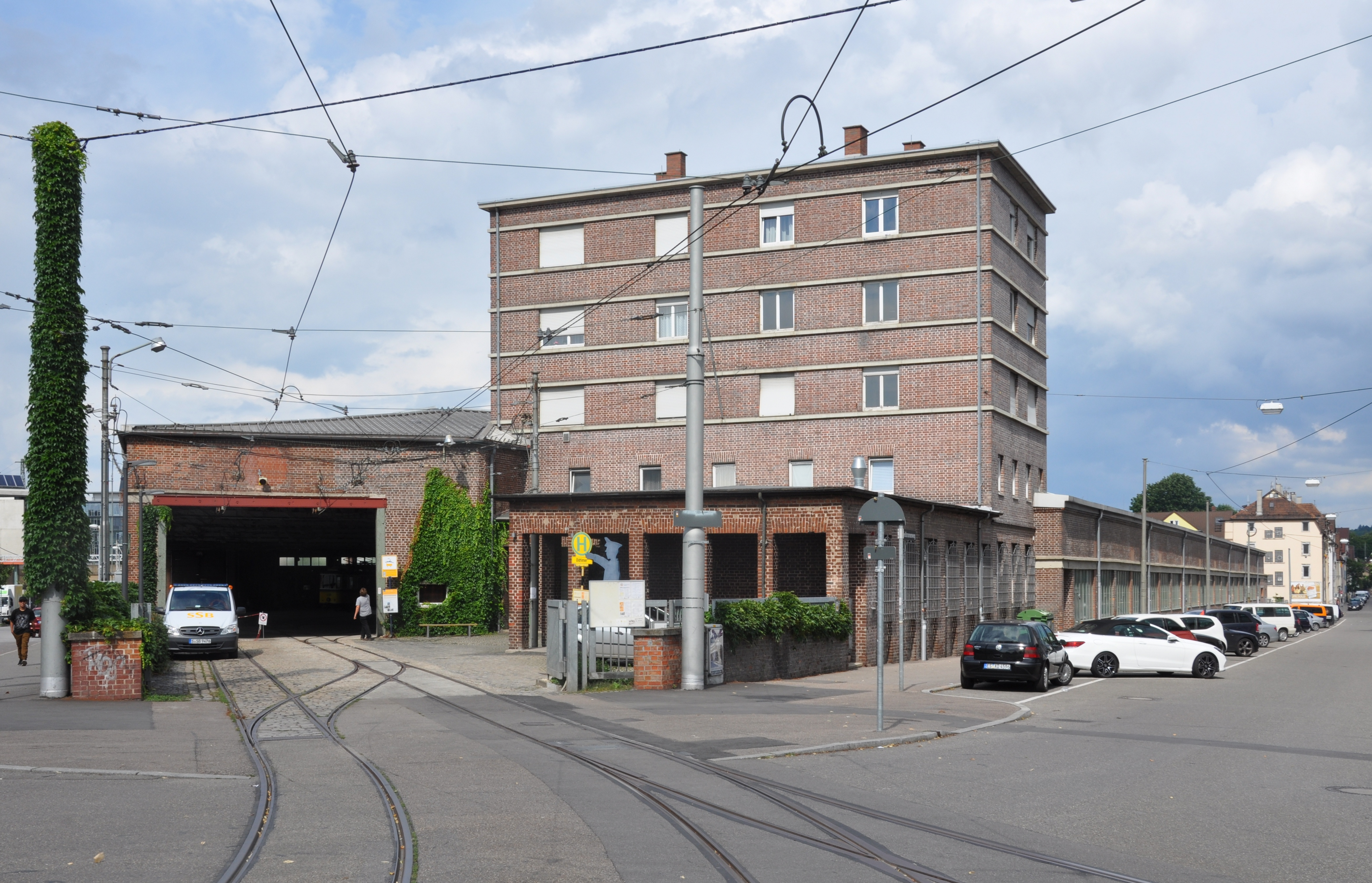
Exterior view of the Stuttgart Tram Museum: the lower hall on the right and the upper hall with the gate on the left
