= Standseilbahn Stuttgart =

Funicular railway in Stuttgart, Germany

Coordinates: 48°45′21″N 9°08′32″E

Stuttgart Cable Car

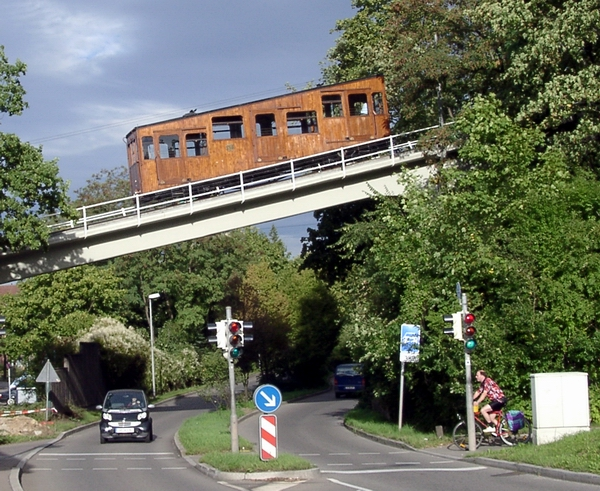
- The funicular ascending to the forest cemetery

Overview
- Native name: Standseilbahn Stuttgart
- Status: operational
- Locale: Heslach, Stuttgart, Germany
- Termini: Südheimer Platz (lower); Südfriedhof (upper)
- Stations: 2

Service
- Type: funicular
- System: Stuttgarter Straßenbahnen AG (SSB)
- Route number: 20

History
- Opened: 30 October 1929

Technical
- Line length: 536 metres (586 yd)
- Number of tracks: 1
- Track gauge: 1,000 mm (3 ft 3 3/8 in) metre gauge

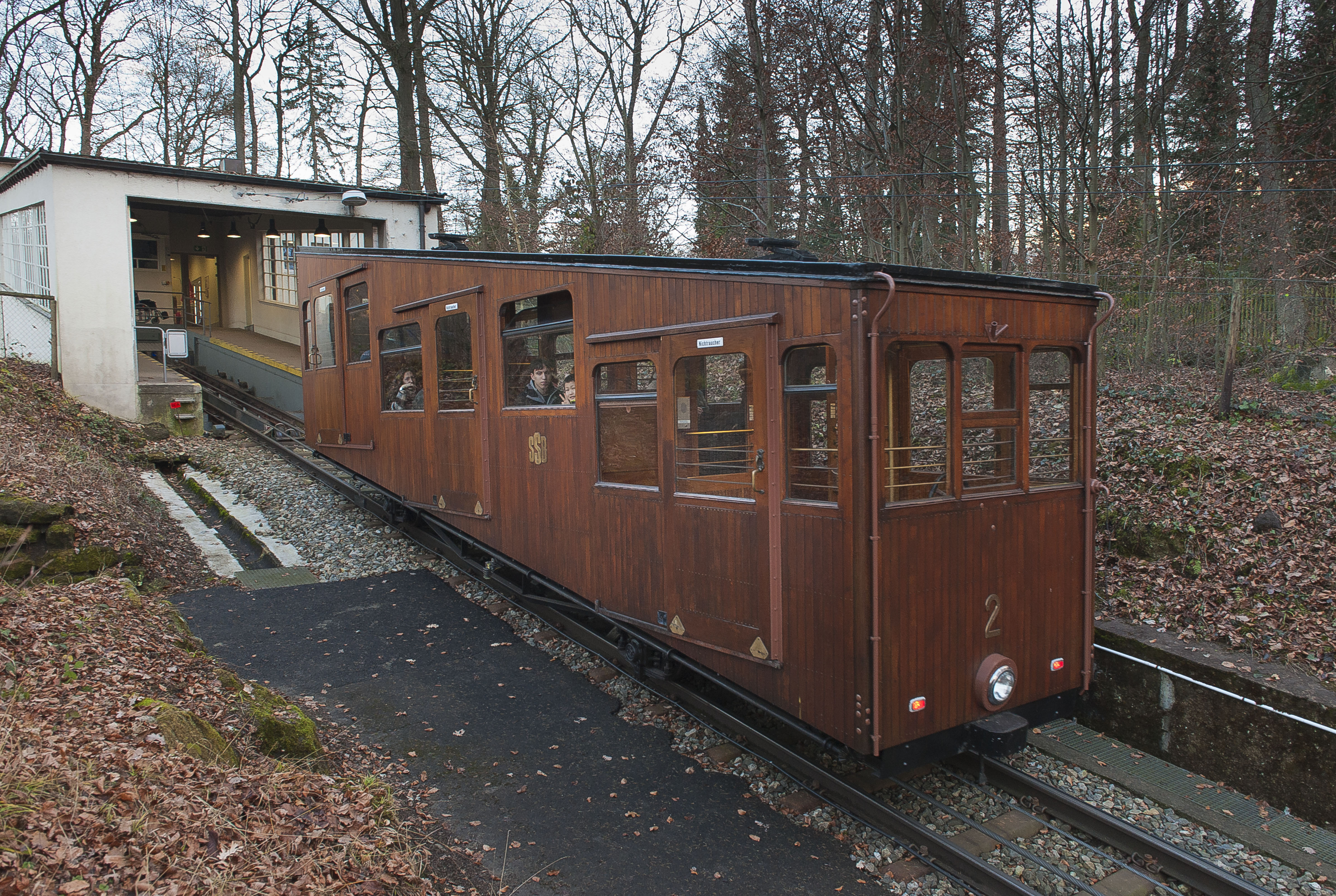
Car number 2 at the upper station

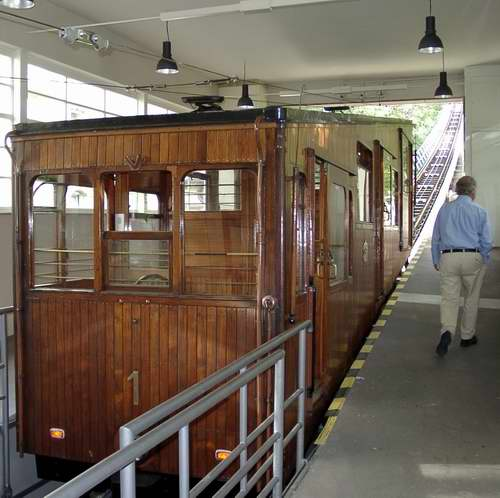
Car number 1 in the lower station

The Standseilbahn Stuttgart or Stuttgart Cable Car is a funicular railway in the city of Stuttgart, Germany. The line links the Südheimer Platz valley station with the Stuttgart Degerloch forest cemetery in the south quarters of Heslach. Operated by Stuttgarter Straßenbahnen AG (SSB), it was opened on 30 October 1929 to facilitate visitors to the forest cemetery which is located 90 metres (295 ft) above Stuttgart Heslach. At Südheimer Platz, the funicular connects to Stuttgart Stadtbahn lines U1 and U14.

== Overview ==
The funicular has the following technical parameters:

- Altitude difference: 87 metres (285 ft)
- Maximum steepness: 28.3%
- Journey time: 3 minutes
- Capacity: 74 passengers per car
- Traction: Cable-hauled, electric

The two cars, constructed of teak, were manufactured by Maschinenfabrik Esslingen. In December 1999, one of the cars was damaged by an uprooted tree as a result of a thunderstorm, but was afterwards restored. The line was modernized in 2004 in order to meet the new European Union safety guidelines for cable cars after the Kaprun disaster. Since 24 July 2004, it is again running on schedule.

The line is one of two active transport tourist attractions in Stuttgart, the other being the Stuttgart Rack Railway (line 10).

The line sometimes is referred to as 'Erbschleicherexpress' which translates as legacy hunter express.

== See also ==
- List of funicular railways
