= Stebler =

Stebler is a Swiss surname. It may refer to:

- Stebler, notable family in Busswil bei Büren, Switzerland
- Annie Stebler-Hopf (1861–1918), Swiss painter
- Christian Stebler, Swiss cross-country skier
- Fred Stebler House, officially designated landmark in Riverside, California
- Friedrich Gottlieb Stebler (1852–1935), Swiss agriculturalist and ethnographer
- Peter Stebler (1927–2010), Swiss Olympic rower
- Pius Stebler, Swiss politician
- Serge Stebler, mayor of French commune Roppeviller, 2020
- Urs Stebler, member of Handball Grauholz, 2008-2009

== See also ==
- Stabler (surname)
- Stäbler
