= Helen Waimel Robertson =

Canadian sculptor

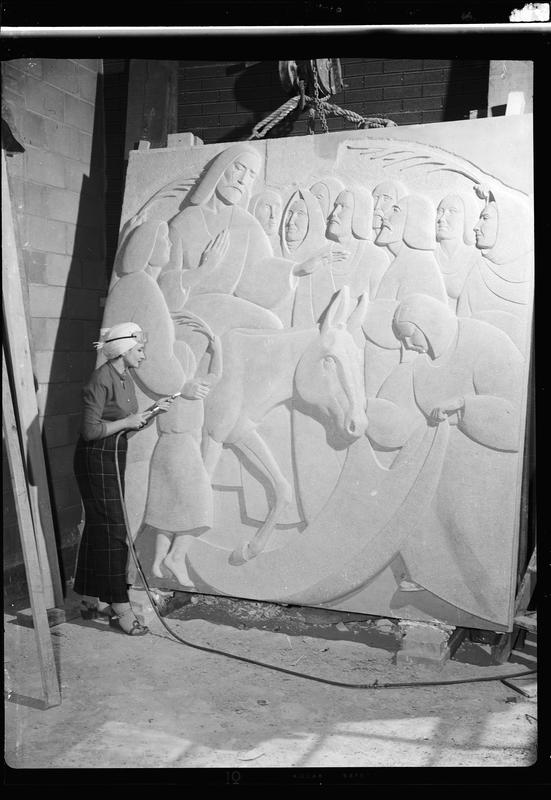
- Helen Robertson working on a stone panel (1953).
- Born: Tartu, Estonia
- Education: OCAD University

Helen Waimel Robertson née Staebler (1917-2002) was a Canadian sculptor.

== Biography ==
Born in Tartu, Estonia, Robertson emigrated with her family to Canada in 1926. In 1934, she received a scholarship to attend Ontario College of Art. One of her teachers was Emanuel Hahn, the first president of the Sculptors Society of Canada. She graduated from the four-year program in three years, and was the recipient of a Governor General's Academic Medal. Robinson became a member of the Sculptors' Society of Canada in 1954. Robertson eventually settled in Chippawa, Ontario, with her husband A. Blake Robertson and lived there for the rest of her life.

== Work ==
Robertson worked in several media, including metals, stone, and wood. She was commissioned by the Canadian government to sculpt coats of arms and other works. She designed the Canadian Coat of Arms in the St. Catharine's Federal Building, the coat of arms in the Customs Building in Niagara Falls, and Stations for the Cross for St. Kevin's Roman Catholic Church, Welland. Other commissions include works for the Colonnade in Toronto, the Cobourg Municipal Building, the Niagara Falls City Hall, St. Denis School in St. Catharines, and the Workman's Compensation Rehabilitation Centre.

In 1940, Robertson sculpted water nymphs for the Bullas Bros. Furniture store on Charles Street, Kitchener and they adorned that building until it was torn down in 1985. The city put the Bullas sculptures in storage as it searched for a permanent site for them until placing the cast stone works in the Centre In The Square.

In November 2002, the Niagara Parks Commission and Robertson's family unveiled three sculptures outside of the Niagara Parks Greenhouse. The three bronze sculptures are collectively known as 'Golden Fountain'.
