= Stabb =

Stabb is an English surname. Notable people with this surname include:

- Chris Stabb (born 1976), English football player
- Fred Stabb (1920–2011), Australian Australian rules football player
- George Stabb (1912–1994), English football player
- John Stabb (musician) (1961–2016), American punk-rock vocalist
- John Stabb (ecclesiologist) (1865–1917), English ecclesiologist and antiquary
- Newton John Stabb (1868–1931), Canadian banker
- Roy Stabb (1922–2010), Australian Australian rules football player
