= Degerloch =

City district in Baden-Württemberg, Germany

Coordinates: 48°44′49″N 9°10′14″E

Coat of arms of Degerloch

Degerloch (German pronunciation: [ˈdeːɡɐlɔx]) is one of the stadtbezirke, or city districts, of Stuttgart in Baden-Württemberg, Germany. Degerloch was founded in 1956 through the merger of the former municipality of Degerloch and the former district of Hoffeld. Degerloch is a traditional wine-growing area, producing mainly Trollinger. Degerloch is connected by the Stuttgart Rack Railway to the city of Stuttgart. Its population is 16,527 (2020).

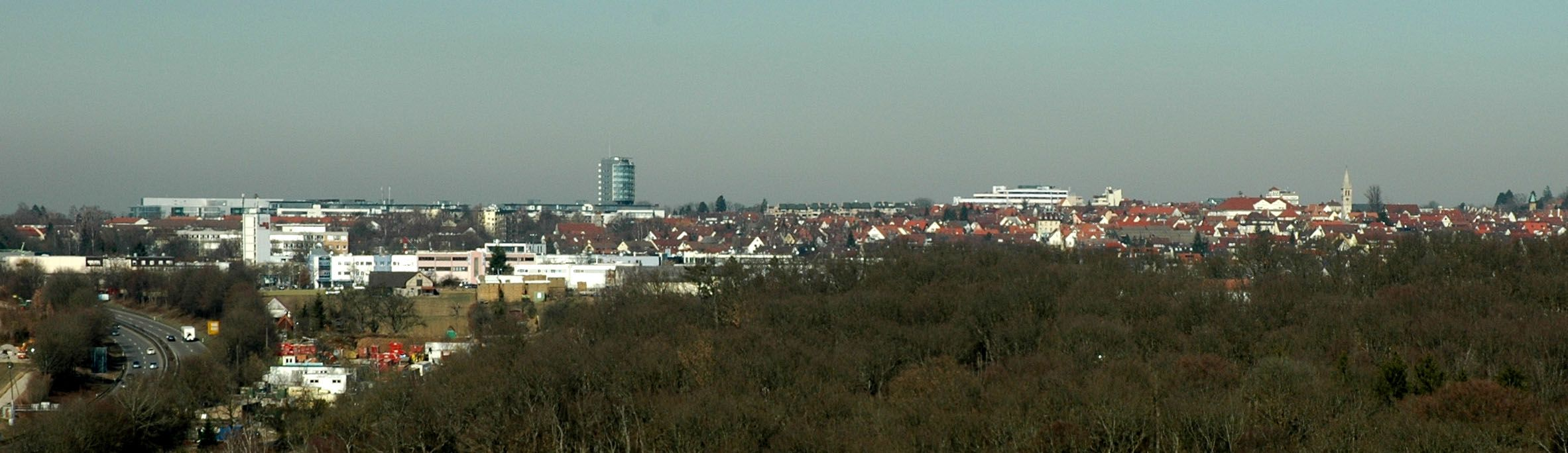
Stuttgart-Degerloch
