= Edward Stabler =

American linguist

Edward Stabler is a Professor of Linguistics at the University of California, Los Angeles. His primary areas of research are (1) Natural Language Processing (NLP), (2) Parsing and formal language theory, and (3) Philosophy of Logic and Language. He was a member of the faculty at UCLA from 1984 to 2016. His work involves the production of software for minimalist grammars (MGs) and related systems.

== Early life and education ==
Stabler received his Ph.D. from the Department of Linguistics and Philosophy at MIT in 1981.

== Recent publications ==
- Edward Stabler (2011) Computational perspectives on minimalism. Revised version in C. Boeckx, ed, Oxford Handbook of Linguistic Minimalism, pp. 617–642.
- Edward Stabler (2010) A defense of this perspective against the Evans&Levinson critique appears here, with revised version in Lingua 120(12): 2680-2685.
- Edward Stabler (2010) After GB. Revised version in J. van Benthem & A. ter Meulen, eds, Handbook of Logic and Language, pp. 395–414.
- Edward Stabler (2010) Recursion in grammar and performance. Presented at the 2009 UMass recursion conference.
- Edward Stabler (2009) Computational models of language universals. Revised version appears in M. H. Christiansen, C. Collins, and S. Edelman, eds., Language Universals, Oxford: Oxford University Press, pages 200-223.
- Edward Stabler (2008) Tupled pregroup grammars. Revised version appears in P. Casadio and J. Lambek, eds., Computational Algebraic Approaches to Natural Language, Milan: Polimetrica, pages 23–52.
- Edward Stabler (2006) Sidewards without copying. Proceedings of the 11th Conference on Formal Grammar, edited by P. Monachesi, G. Penn, G. Satta, and S. Wintner. Stanford: CSLI Publications, 2006, pages 133-146.
