= Stuttgart Stadtbahn =

Light rail system in Stuttgart, Baden-Württemberg, Germany

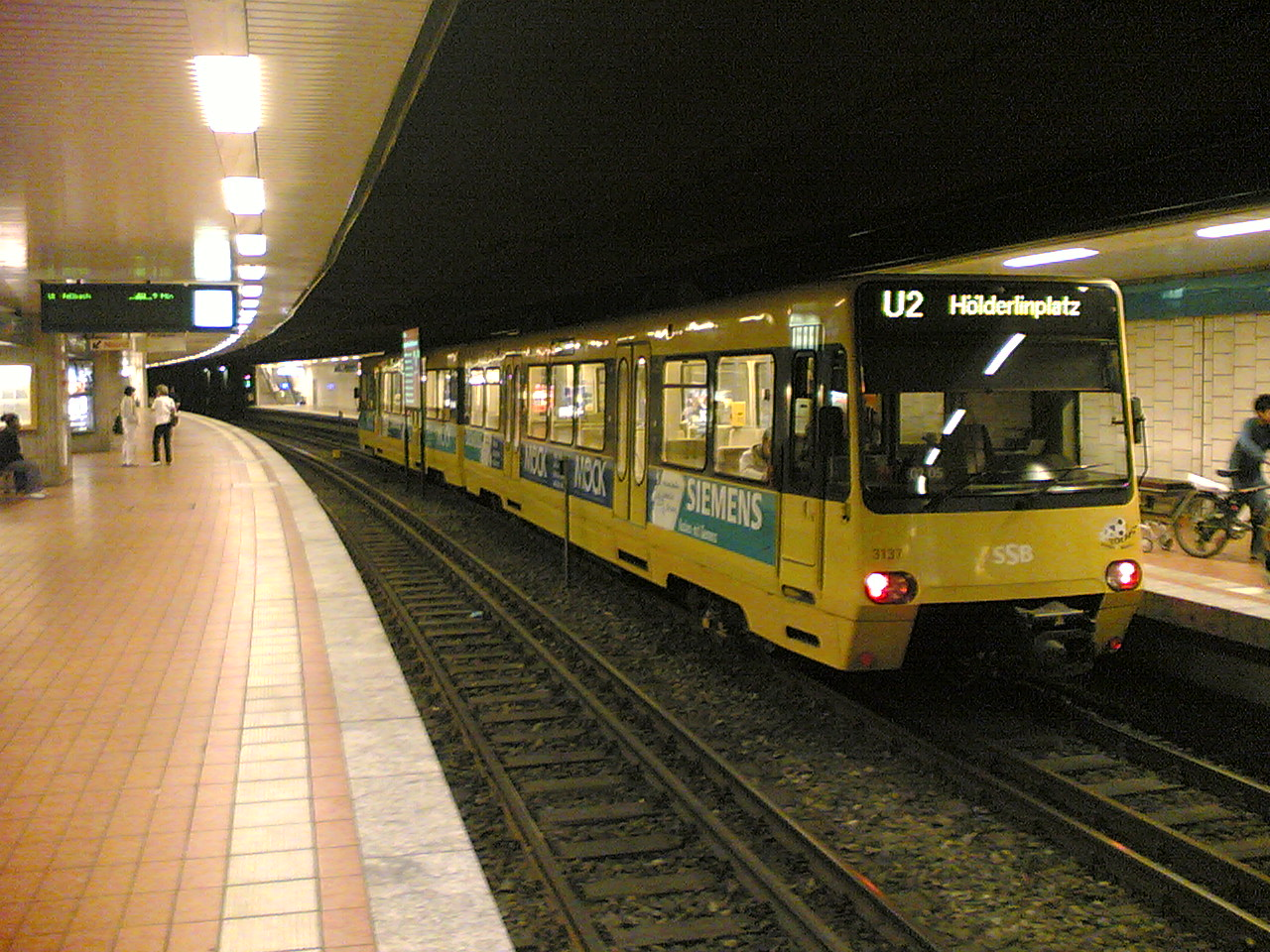
- Stuttgart Rathaus Stadtbahn underground station

Overview
- Locale: Stuttgart, Baden-Württemberg, Germany
- Transit type: Light rail Stadtbahn
- Number of lines: 15 (& 2 special event lines)
- Number of stations: 203 (2013)
- Annual ridership: 174.9 million (2014)
- Website: Stuttgarter Straßenbahnen AG (SSB)

Operation
- Began operation: 28 September 1985
- Operator: Stuttgarter Straßenbahnen AG
- Number of vehicles: 179 (2013)
- Headway: 10 minutes (daytime)

Technical
- System length: 130 km (81 mi) (2013)
- Track gauge: 1,435 mm (4 ft 8 1/2 in) standard gauge
- Electrification: 750 V DC overhead lines
- Average speed: 27 km/h (17 mph)
- Top speed: 80 km/h (50 mph)
Stuttgart Stadtbahn
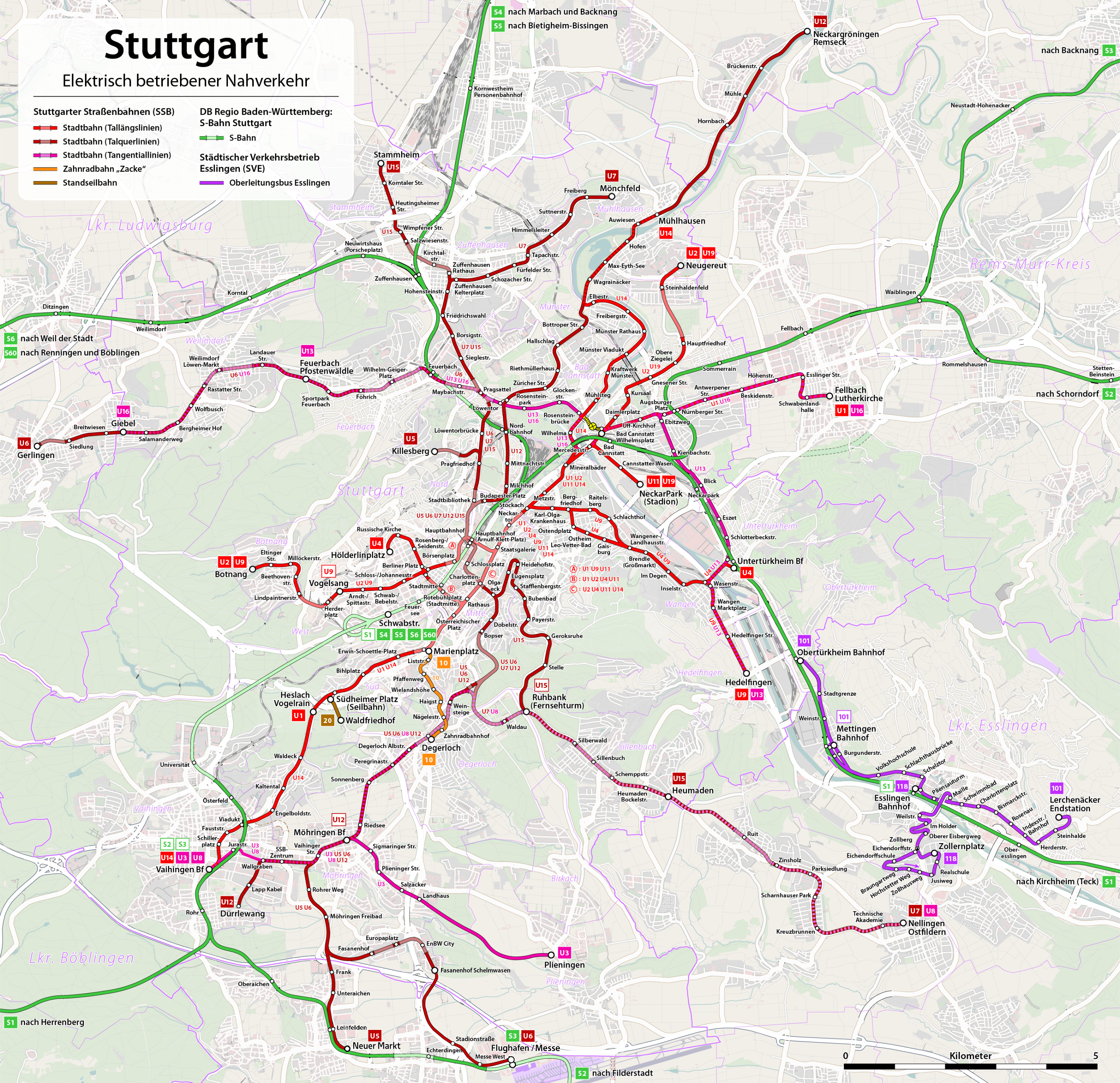
Map of Stuttgart Stadtbahn network before December 2021

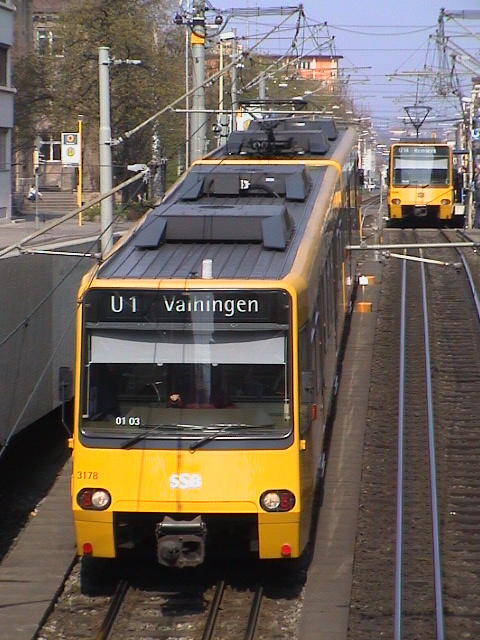
A Stadtbahn train; the mixed gauge track is visible.

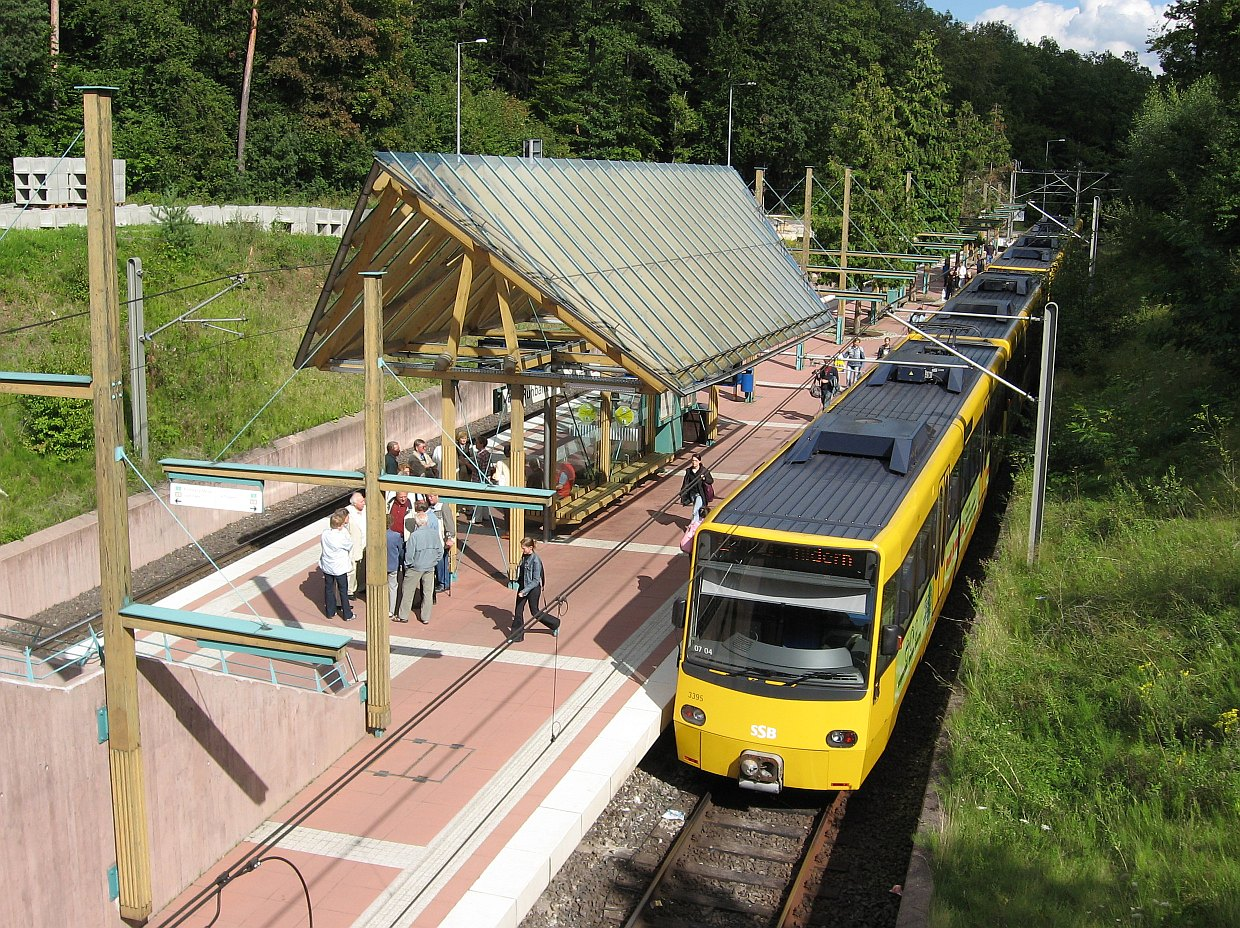
Ruhbank Stadtbahn station

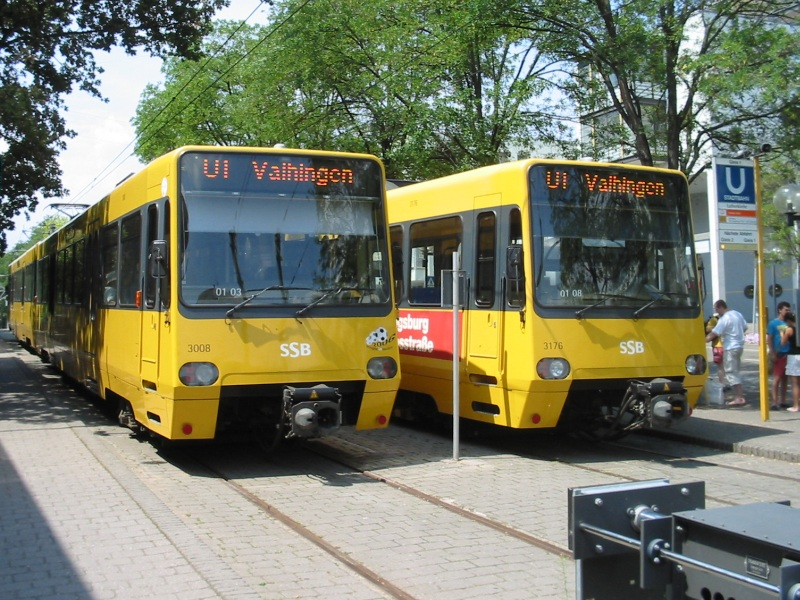
Stadtbahn cars at the terminus of line U1

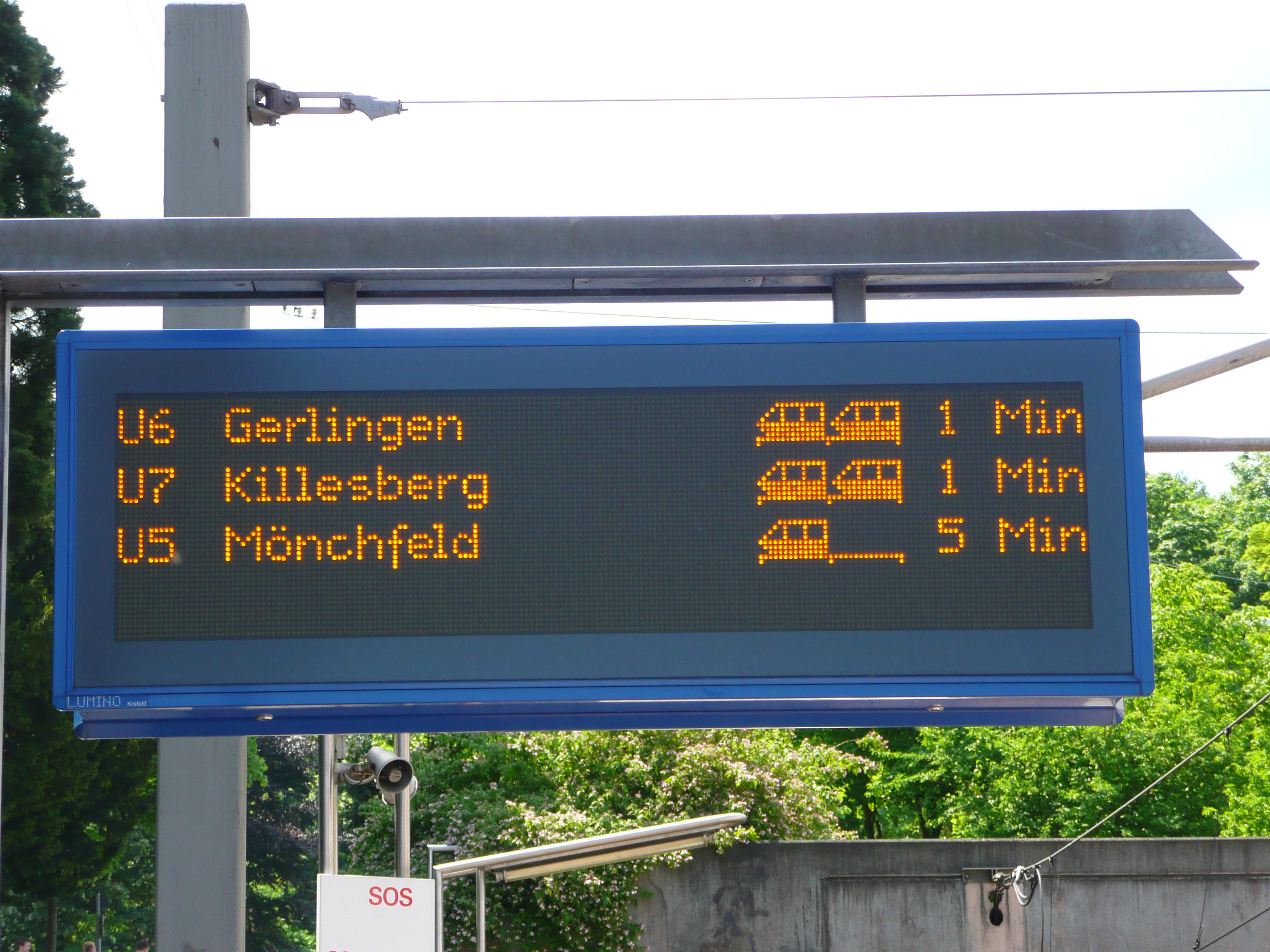
A sign at a light rail stop in Stuttgart which includes information advising passengers whether services will be formed of single or double / twin light rail vehicles

The Stuttgart Stadtbahn is a light rail Stadtbahn system in Stuttgart, Germany. The Stadtbahn began service on 28 September 1985. It is operated by the Stuttgarter Straßenbahnen AG (SSB), which also operates the bus systems in that city. The Stuttgart Stadtbahn is successor system of a tram network (Straßenbahnen) that characterized the urban traffic in Stuttgart for decades, being phased out on 8th December 2007.

The network of the Stadtbahn covers much of Stuttgart and also reaches the neighbouring towns of Remseck am Neckar, Fellbach, Ostfildern, Leinfelden-Echterdingen and Gerlingen (clockwise). Currently, the Stuttgart Stadtbahn system is made up of fourteen main lines (U1-U9, U12-U15, U19), a special event line (U11) and two temporary lines during construction site, serving 203 stations, and operating on 130 kilometres (81 mi) of route. In 2014, the Stuttgart Stadtbahn carried 174.9 million passengers.

== Route network ==
=== Current lines ===
As of 2026, the Stuttgart Stadtbahn system consists of:

- longitudinal lines that run lengthways through the valley basin (U1, U2, U4, U9, U14)
- cross-valley lines that run across the valley (U5, U6, U7, U12, U15)
- tangential lines that run tangentially past the valley (U3, U8, U13, U16, U19)
- special lines or event lines that only run for special events (U11)
- line number 10 is reserved for the cog railway and line 20 for the cable car.

Line	Route	Stations	Journey time (in minutes)
U1	Fellbach Lutherkirche – Bad Cannstatt – Charlottenplatz – Marienplatz – Heslach	27	41
U2	Neugereut – Bad Cannstatt – Rotebühlplatz – Vogelsang – Botnang	28	36
U3	Plieningen – Möhringen – Vaihingen	11	13
U4	Untertürkheim – Ostendplatz – Neckartor – Charlottenplatz – Rotebühlplatz – Hölderlinplatz	22	25
U5	Killesberg – Hauptbahnhof – Charlottenplatz – Degerloch – Möhringen – Leinfelden Neuer Markt (Note: U5 normally runs only every 20 minutes.) (Note: During major events on the Killesberg, such as the Festival of Lights, the service is split into two parts: between Killesberg and Degerloch Albstraße or Möhringen with a more frequent service and double sets as a special line, and between Leinfelden and Waldau with normal services. During smaller events, the service is operated as a ten-minute service only between Degerloch Albstraße and between Möhringen and Killesberg.)	22	29
U6	Gerlingen – Giebel – Feuerbach – Pragsattel – Hauptbahnhof – Charlottenplatz – Degerloch – Möhringen – Fasanenhof – EnBw City – Flughafen / Messe (Note: U6 runs during large public exhibitions, such as the Caravan, Motor und Touristik exhibition additionally every 20 minutes between Killesberg and Messe/Flughafen as a special line between U5 services.)	43	60
U7	Mönchfeld – Zuffenhausen – Pragsattel – Hauptbahnhof – Charlottenplatz – Ruhbank (Fernsehturm) – Heumaden – Ostfildern Nellingen	36	50
U8	Vaihingen – Möhringen – Degerloch – Ruhbank (Fernsehturm) – Heumaden – Ostfildern Nellingen (Note: U8 only runs Monday to Friday from 5:30 a.m. to 8:00 p.m. every 20 minutes and during the afternoon peak hour between Vaihingen and Heumaden every ten minutes.) (Note: The U7 and U15 lines will be routed as U8 between the SSB-Zentrum and Ostfildern (U7) or Heumaden (U15). The entry and exit services marked in the timetable may be cancelled if the double set operation of the U7 at SSB-Zentrum does not stop at the usual time, for example during major events.)	26	33
U9	Hedelfingen – Raitelsberg – Charlottenplatz – Vogelsang – Botnang (Note: Service to Botnang only during the peak hour on school days.)	22 [28]	27 [35]
U11	Hauptbahnhof – Rotebühlplatz (Stadtmitte) – Charlottenplatz – Cannstatter Wasen / Neckarpark (Stadion) (Note: (Only during the Volksfest, Spring Festival, sport, music or other events.)) (Note: (No stop at the Berliner Platz (Hohe Str.) and Staatsgalerie stations.))	13/14	17
U12	Remseck – Hallschlag – Löwentor – Nordbahnhof – Hauptbahnhof – Charlottenplatz – Degerloch – Möhringen – Dürrlewang	36	50
U13	[Giebel –] Feuerbach – Pragsattel – Löwentor – Bad Cannstatt – Untertürkheim – Hedelfingen (Service to Giebel only during the rush hour on school days.)	25	38
U14	Mühlhausen – Münster – Charlottenplatz-Heslach Vogelrain-Vaihingen Bf	33	41
U15	Stammheim – Zuffenhausen – Pragsattel – Hauptbahnhof – Charlottenplatz – Eugensplatz – Ruhbank (Fernsehturm) [– Heumaden] (Note: U15 runs during school holidays and outside of the morning rush hour only between Stammheim and Ruhbank/Fernsehturm.)	27 [32]	37 [45]
U16	Giebel – Feuerbach – Pragsattel – Löwentor – Wilhelma – Bad Cannstatt – Fellbach Lutherkirche (Note: Only runs Monday to Friday during peak hour.)	30	43
U19	Neugereut – Bad Cannstatt – Neckarpark (Stadion) (Note: U19 only runs Monday to Friday from 6:30 a.m. to 8:00 p.m. (during school holidays no trips between 9 a.m. and 3 p.m.)).) (Note: During smaller sporting events and concerts, U19 also runs on the Bad Cannstatt Wilhelmsplatz – Neckarpark section with a more frequent service as a special line.)	9	20

The U6, U7 and U12 lines run Monday to Saturday during the day as double sets as 80-metre long trains. The event line U11 and the special event services on the U5 run as double sets when required. All lines except the U5 and U8 run every ten minutes during the day during their operating hours.

=== Development of the route network ===
Stuttgart Stadtbahn, now all 1,435 mm (4 ft 8 1/2 in) standard gauge, developed out of a traditional tramway system, which in Stuttgart was 1,000 mm (3 ft 3 3/8 in) metre gauge.

In 1961 the city council of Stuttgart decided that a general modernisation of the municipal tram system was needed; in central areas, tram track would be relocated underground, and in peripheral areas it would get new tracks that would be separate from road traffic. Concurrent proposals for a new completely underground subway (U-Bahn) were rejected in 1976. At the same time, it was decided to modernise the existing tram infrastructure and change from metre gauge to the standard gauge. For this reason, tracks were initially converted to mixed-gauge, on which old trams (SSB GT4, built 1959–1965) could run as well as new metro cars (SSB DT 8, in regular service since 1985).

In 1989, the light rail lines were given new numbers U1, U3 and U14 to distinguish them from the S-Bahn and tram lines. The E-line to Cannstatter Wasen and the stadium was renamed to U11 in 1994.

==== Network 2011 ====
The SSB changed the route of some light rail lines at the timetable change on 12 December 2010. The north branches of the lines U5 and U7 were exchanged, so that the U5 now goes to Killesberg and the U7 to Mönchfeld. Likewise, the U4 runs—as 25 years ago—from Berliner Platz on the previous route of the U2 to Hölderlinplatz, while the U2 runs instead to Botnang. The change connects outer branches with equally high volumes. The large residential area of Zuffenhausen/Rot/Freiberg/Mönchfeld is now served by double sets on the U7 lines, eliminating the previous overcrowding. The U2 also now serves two heavily frequented outer branches, where an expansion of capacity is being considered.

Line U12 operated until 2013 between Möhringen and Killesberg (in the peak hour: Vaihingen–Killesberg). On the Möhringen–Vaihingen section, it partially replaced the U6, which has been operating from Möhringen since 11 December 2010 to the Fasanenhof-Ost industrial area. Since 11 December 2011, the U15 line has also been running on the newly built section between Zuffenhausen and Stammheim.

==== Network 2013 ====
With the opening of the new section of the line north of the Löwentorkreuzung to Hallschlag on 14 September 2013, the route network was changed. The previous section of the U15, from the Stadtbibliothek stop on Nordbahnhofstraße to the Löwentor crossing, has since been served by the U12, which runs from there to Hallschlag. The U15 has since run on Heilbronner Straße directly to Pragsattel. From now on, Killesberg will only be served by the U5 every 20 minutes.

==== Network 2016/2018 ====
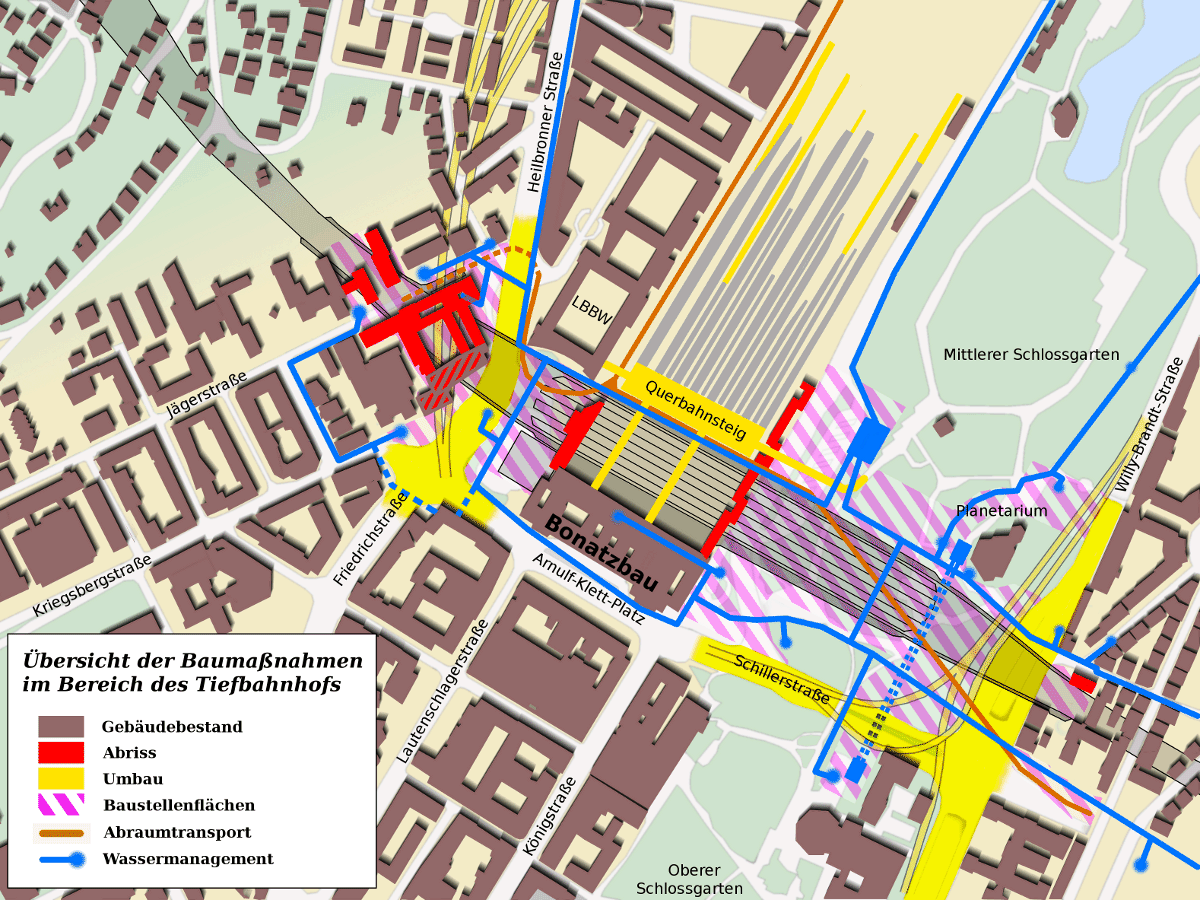
Construction work on the new Hauptbahnhof as part of Stuttgart 21. Stadtbahn projects in yellow: to the west of the Bonatz building the Heilbronner Straße Stadtbahn tunnel, to the east the new Staatsgalerie stop

The lines planned in the context of Stuttgart 21 require a new Staatsgalerie railway station to be built and the tunnel between Staatsgalerie and the adjoining tunnel. The Staatsgalerie–Charlottenplatz and Staatsgalerie–Hauptbahnhof sections of the line were interrupted and rebuilt over seven and a half years.

The Staatsgalerie–Charlottenplatz section was closed from May 2016 until December 2017 ("Network 2016"). The U1 and U2 lines were diverted via the Hauptbahnhof, the U4 line only ran as far as Neckartor with a turnaround at the Staatsgalerie stop. The U11 ran in both directions via the inner-city loop with a turnaround at Charlottenplatz. In order to maintain the connection between the Charlottenplatz stop and the northern branch of the U4 to Hölderlinplatz (there is no connection from Hauptbahnhof at Berliner Platz), the additional lines, U21 (Charlottenplatz–Südheimer Platz) and U24 (Charlottenplatz–Hölderlinplatz) were introduced.

From December 2017 until December 2023, the Staatsgalerie–Hauptbahnhof section was closed ("Network 2018"). The U9 was routed via Charlottenplatz to Heslach Vogelrain and supplemented by the additional line U29, which connected to the Hauptbahnhof, which can only be reached from the north, with the actual terminus of the U9 at Vogelsang (in peak hours in Botnang). The U14 line was routed via the inner-city loop to the Hauptbahnhof and was supplemented by the additional line U34 until summer 2023, which ran from Vogelsang to Südheimer Platz (if the S-Bahn main line was closed during peak hours, it also continued to Vaihingen Bf).

For the 2018 network, it was initially planned that the U14 would run from Mühlhausen via the Leuzeknoten and Bad Cannstatt to Neugereut instead of into the city center, where it would relieve the U2 and increase its traffic on its more frequented Bad Cannstatt–Neugereut section. The U11 was planned to be used in regular service for the connection to the city center.These plans were abandoned after a trial run from 17 October 2016 to 13 April 2017 in favour of the U19 reinforcement line, which finally began scheduled operations on 16 October 2017. It runs between Neugereut and Neckarpark and increases the frequency of the U2 on the section in question to approximately every five minutes. In addition, the U34 was to start in Heslach and go to the Hauptbahnhof instead of Vogelsang. The end point of the U9 would have been at Südheimer Platz instead.

With the timetable change on 9 December 2017, as part of the closing of the gap on the U12 between Hallschlag and Wagrainäcker, the U14 was withdrawn to Mühlhausen and the U12 was operated with double sets to its previous terminus in Remseck-Neckargröningen.

With the timetable change in December 2018, the new supplementary line U16 (Giebel–Fellbach) also began operations. It offers additional capacity during peak hours on the heavily used sections: Fellbach–Bad Cannstatt, Bad Cannstatt–Pragsattel and Pragsattel–Giebel. The U13, which previously ran to Giebel during peak hours, was withdrawn as far as Feuerbach Pfostenwäldle.

==== Network 2024 ====
With the timetable change on 10 December 2023, following the commissioning of the new tunnel between the State Gallery and the Hauptbahnhof, it was possible to return to the original Stadtbahn network, before the restrictions imposed by Stuttgart 21 (networks 2016 and 2018). In addition, the U1 and U14 lines swapped their southern and central branches as a preliminary measure for the capacity increase of the U1. In the future, the U1 will run via the inner-city loop (Hauptbahnhof–Berliner Platz–Rotebühlplatz) and on to Heslach Vogelrain (if the S-Bahn main line is closed during peak hour, initially also on to Vaihingen) and the U14 via Charlottenplatz and Rathaus to Vaihingen Bahnhof. The line swap in the city centre is due to better utilisation of vehicle capacity and the connection of the Neckar valley around Mühlhausen with the city centre by the U12.

The U11 again ran anticlockwise through the inner city loop and the additional lines U34 (already discontinued due to a lack of staff) and U29 were made obsolete by the return of U9 and U14 and thus discontinued. In addition, the U8 will now take over the U15 services to Heumaden during the afternoon peak hour and will be intensified to a ten-minute cycle between Vaihingen and Heumaden during this time.

== Current light rail system ==
The Stadtbahn system runs over 257 kilometres (160 mi) of rail track, and 231 kilometres (144 mi) of rail line, covering 130 kilometres (81 mi) of route. (The Stuttgart rail system also encompasses a rack railway (Line 10), a funicular (Line 20), and a weekend heritage tram line (Line 21).) In the city centre as well as in other densely built-up districts of the city, the Stadtbahn runs underground. The Stadtbahn uses the "U" logo like the underground systems (U-Bahnen) in other German cities. However, here the "U" does not stand for untergrund (underground) but for unabhängig (independent, meaning independent of other traffic infrastructure). Outside the densely built up areas, the Stadtbahn runs on the surface, often along roads with level crossings, though on a separate right-of-way. However some trains, especially U15 line's trains, operate partially with street running and share space with other traffic.

=== Rolling stock ===
The system's fleet consists of 224 light rail vehicles, all of which are variants of the DT8 model. The system operates on standard gauge track, and is electrified at 750 volts DC.

Current fleet:

Fleet #	Image	Type	Year Delivered	Make	Notes
3008–3086		DT8.4	1985-86	Duewag	
3300–3346		DT8.10	1999–2000	ADtranz/Siemens	
3347–3400		DT8.11	2004-05	Bombardier	
3501–3540		DT8.12	2012–14	Stadler	based on Stadler Tango
3541–3580		DT8.14	2017	Stadler	based on Stadler Tango
3581–3620		DT8.15	2021–23	Stadler	based on Stadler Tango
4087–4104		DT8.S	1988	Duewag	formerly DT8.5, 3087–3104, before refurbishment by Bombardier
4105–4168		DT8.S	1989–1990	Duewag	formerly DT8.6, 3105–3168, before refurbishment by Bombardier
4169–4180		DT8.S	1992	Duewag	formerly DT8.7, 3169–3180, before refurbishment by Bombardier
4181–4202		DT8.S	1993	Duewag	formerly DT8.8, 3181–3202, before refurbishment by Bombardier
4203–4234		DT8.S	1996	Duewag	formerly DT8.9, 3203–3234, before refurbishment by Bombardier

==== Color ====
Since the coat of arms of Stuttgart shows a black, rampant horse on a yellow or golden field, the Stuttgart Stadtbahn (as well as all the buses and the last old trams) comes in yellow with black or dark blue window frames.

=== Hours of operation ===
The Stuttgart Stadtbahn operates from 04:00 - 01:00.

- Monday-Friday: Service frequency is every 10 minutes between 06:00 - 07:00 and 20:00 - 20:30.
- Saturday: Service frequency is every 10 minutes between 09:30 - 10:30 and 20:00 - 20:30.
- Sunday: Service frequency is every 10 minutes between 10:30 - 11:30 and 17:30 - 18:00.
- On all days: Prior to the 10 minute frequency service times the service interval is every 15–30 minutes and after the 10 minute frequency service times the service interval is every 15 minutes.
- Exceptions are the U5 line which operates every 20 minutes during the day and evening (and every 30 minutes at other times) and the U8 line which only operates Monday-Friday from 6:00 to 19:00 with a service frequency of every 20 minutes.

Most routes are served by two or more lines in the city centre, so there is a train every few minutes at most stations.

== Fares and ticketing ==
The Stadtbahn is part of the regional transport cooperative, the Verkehrs- und Tarifverbund Stuttgart (VVS; Stuttgart Transit and Tariff Association), which coordinates tickets and fares among all transport operators in the metropolitan area. Besides the Stadtbahn, these include the SSB's bus networks, together with the Stuttgart S-Bahn, operated by a subsidiary of Deutsche Bahn AG (DBAG), and DBAG's Regionalbahn regional train services within the VVS area.

== History ==
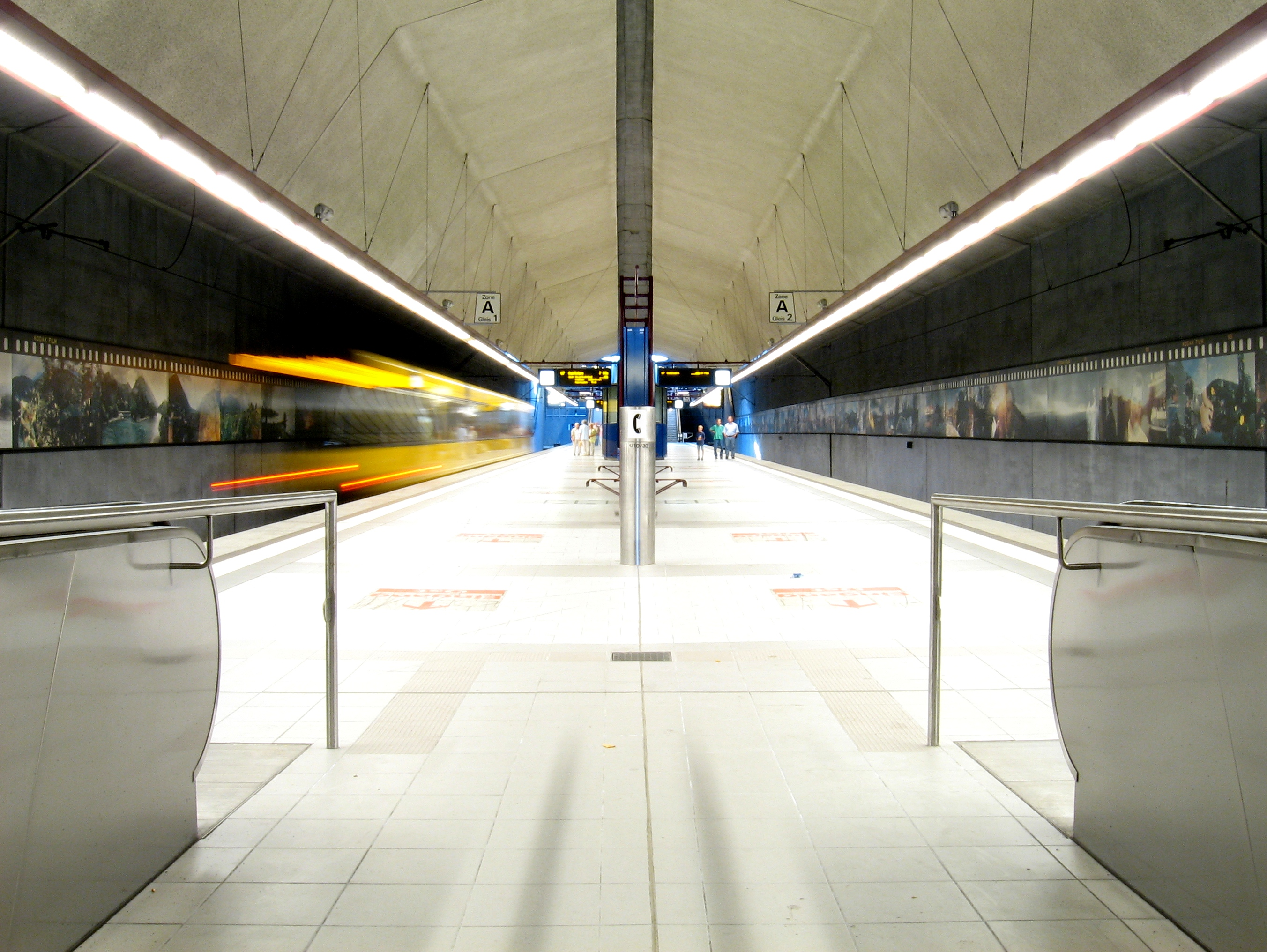
Killesberg station

The Stuttgart Stadtbahn succeeded a tram network that previously dominated urban transport. In 1961, the local council decided to move the rail network in the city centre underground, to switch to new, more powerful vehicles and to separate it from motor traffic in the outer areas as far as possible.

The first tunnel stop was built in 1966 at Charlottenplatz in coordination with the reconstruction of the intersection of federal highways B 14 and B 27, where the routes of the central valley longitudinal (roughly north-south) lines (at that time parallel to the B 14) intersect with the valley transverse lines (parallel to the B 27). A tunnel between Neckartor and Marienplatz (running close to the B 14) was completed in 1972. All tunnel routes and stops were already built with a clearance profile suitable for the planned standard gauge vehicles and the track system was laid out with a third rail for standard gauge. The new vehicles were to be high-floor and the stops were given high platforms.

In the mid-1970s, the introduction of an underground railway was discussed, which would take over the new tunnels, until the decision was made in 1976 to gradually replace trams with a more efficient light rail system. By 1978, Königstrasse and the Hauptbahnhof as well as the sections to the then Universitat (the former site of the university, now Börsenplatz) and Türlenstrasse (now Stadtbibliothek) stations were tunnelled, followed by the Rotebühlplatz stop by 1984, the shell of which was already built in 1978 as part of the S-Bahn construction, and the Siemensstrasse tunnel between Pragsattel and Feuerbach station.

The Stadtbahn network is designed in such a way that it could be converted to a U-Bahn at any time if the financial means were available. Contrary to popular belief, the U in the line name does not stand for underground railway, but for unabhängig—independent (from road traffic).

=== Conversion of tram to Stadtbahn operation ===
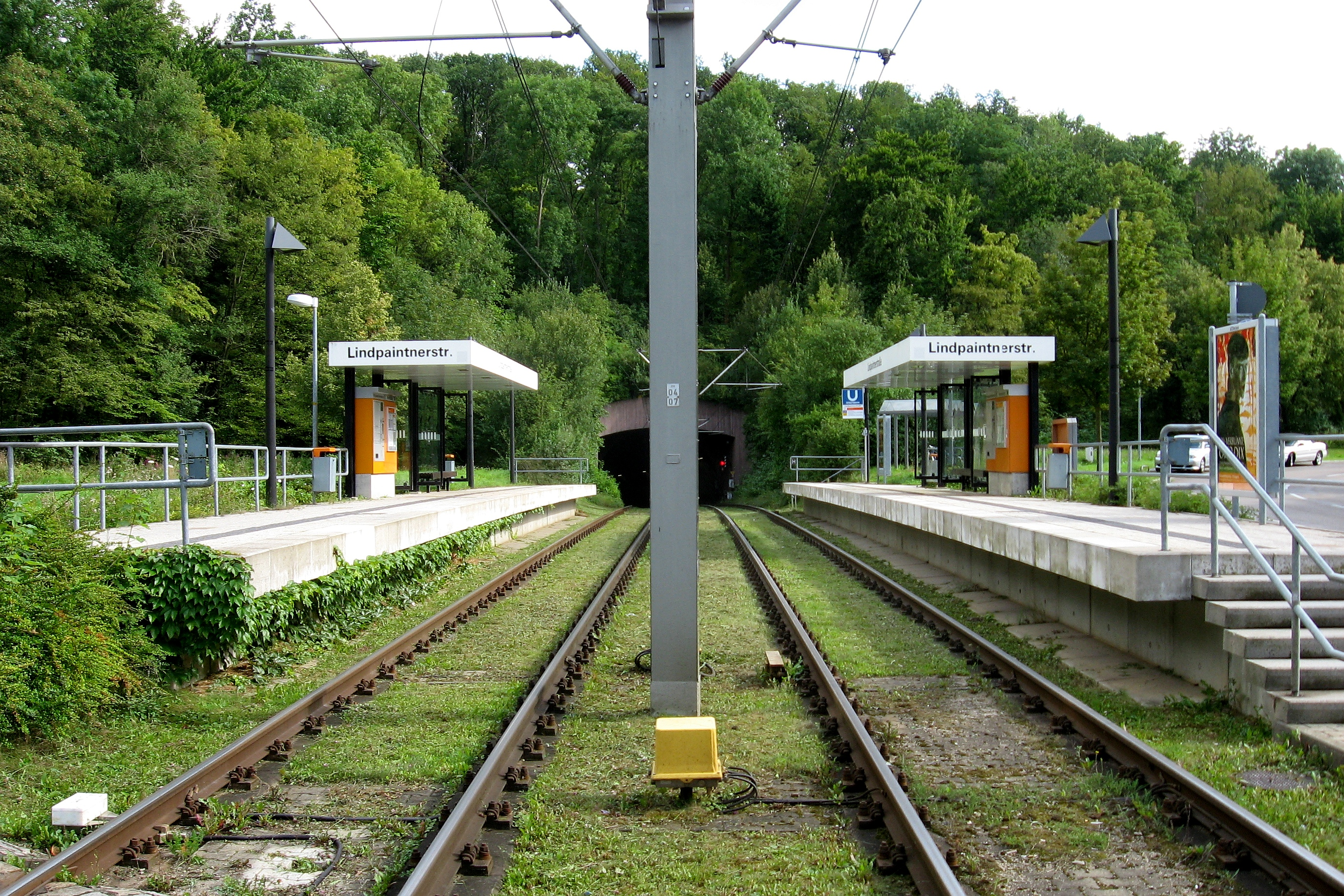
Elevated platforms, in the background the tunnel under the Botnanger saddle

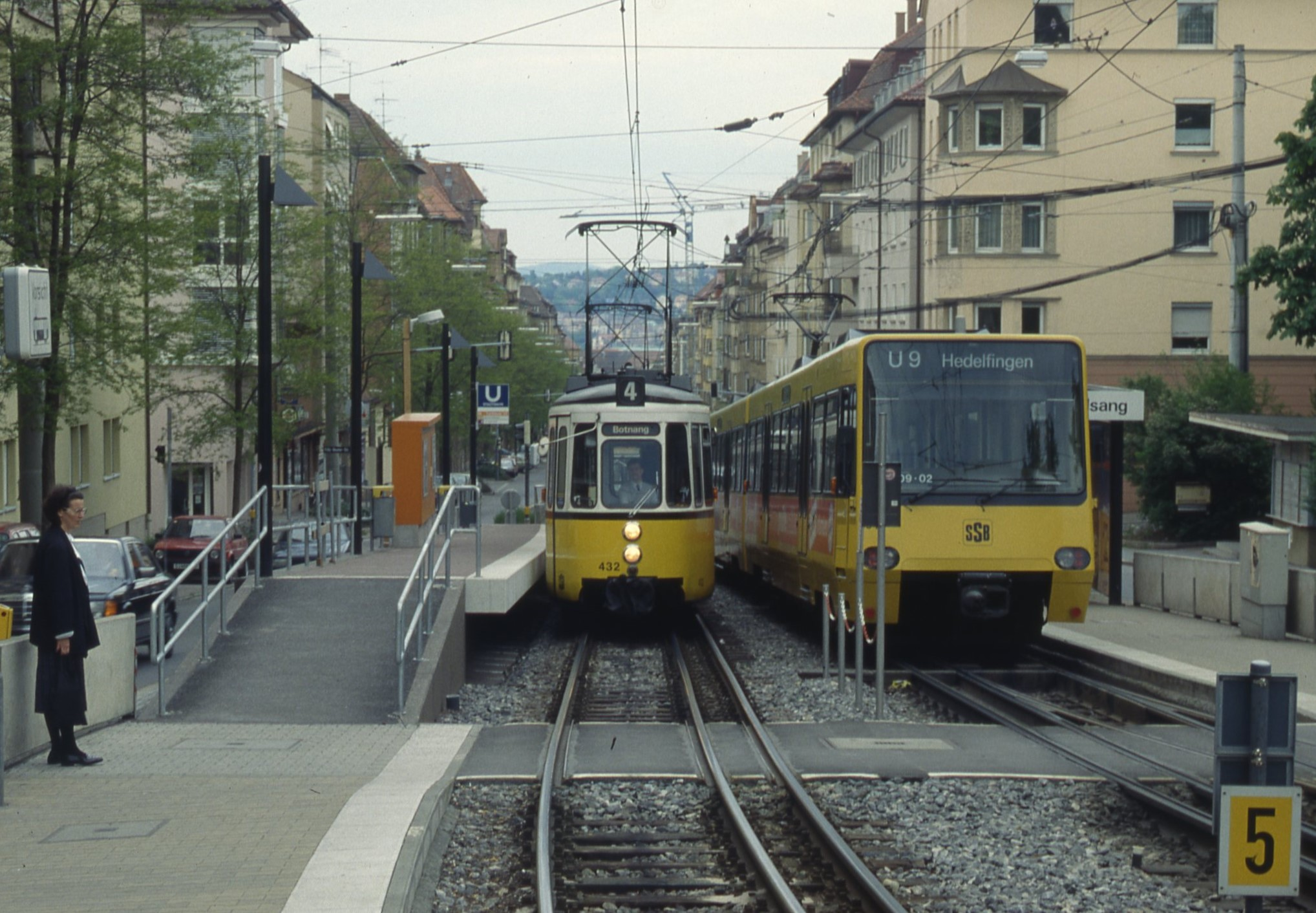
Mixed operation at Vogelsang (1991)

The main criteria for the expansion of the Stadtbahn system were the conversion to standard gauge and the development of a bidirectional vehicle so that the turning loops at the end of the line could be eliminated. In addition, barrier-free access to the trains should be possible without having to climb steps. The DT 8 light rail vehicle, specially developed for Stuttgart, took these requirements into account.

Both systems had to be operated alongside each other for a long period of time with interim solutions. The routes intended for light rail operations were converted to a dual gauge track. The third rail on the inside was later gradually removed where metre-gauge trams were no longer running. Some sections will remain permanently as a three-rail track to enable museum tours by the Stuttgarter Historische Straßenbahnen (Stuttgart Historical Trams). The museum tours run from the Bad Cannstatt Tram Museum to the city centre or to the Ruhbank/Fernsehturm stop.

A further challenge was the different platform heights. With the old trams, boarding was only possible from the street or from an underground platform; with the new light rail vehicle, boarding was possible either via an underground platform or, preferably barrier-free, via a high platform. The older classes of light rail vehicles (DT 8.4, DT 8.5, DT 8.7) are equipped with so-called folding steps, which can be folded out at the underground platforms. While both types of vehicle were still in operation, half of the platforms were converted to high platforms. As soon as the trams were no longer running, the other half could be converted. As part of the program to make the Stadtbahn barrier-free, all stops were equipped with high platforms and, where necessary, lifts by 12 December 2010. The low platforms will remain at the stops for the museum lines 21 and 23.

==== First changes ====
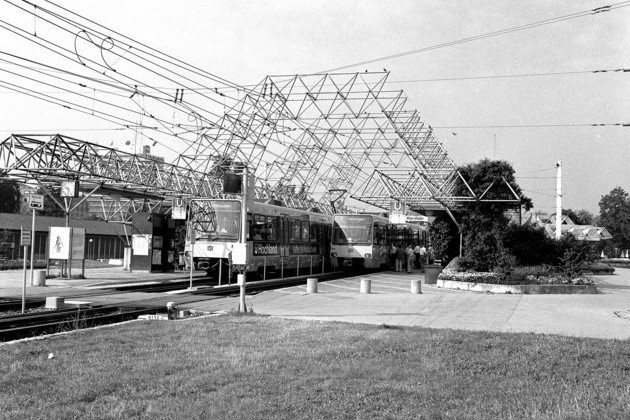
Stadtbahn line 1, a few months after its introduction at Mineralbäder (1986)

From 25 July 1983, three pre-series vehicles of the Stuttgart Stadtbahn railcar DT 8 (DT 8.1 to DT 8.3) were used in trial operation on the Plieningen–Möhringen section of line 3. On 28 September 1985, line 3 from Plieningen to Vaihingen was the first line to be completely converted to a Stadtbahn system. This was followed by lines 1 and 14 on 19 April and 12 July 1986, which were the first times that trams ran through the city centre. In 1988, the Volksfest line (later U11) to Cannstatter Wasen was served by trams for the first time, in 1989 line 9 was converted, and in 1990 two new Stadtbahn lines, the valley crossing lines U5 (Freiberg–Leinfelden) and U6 (Feuerbach–Möhringen), were put into operation simultaneously for the first time.

After the U6 line was extended to Giebel following the completion of the Weilimdorf tunnel in 1992, it ran for the first time to the city limits of Gerlingen (Gerlingen Siedlung stop) in 1993. In 1997, the line was extended in a tunnel beneath the town to the town centre. The U7 (Killesberg Messe–Degerloch), which was introduced for the 1993 World Horticultural Exposition, was the first line to run with double sets in the spring of 1993.

In 1994, the Stadtbahn reached Botnang with the converted line 4. In 1997 and 1998, line 13 was converted (first the Feuerbach–Schlotterbeckstraße section, then the Schlotterbeckstraße–Hedelfingen section). After the opening of the Waldau tunnel at the end of May 1998, the Stadtbahn line U7 from Killesberg no longer ran to Degerloch Albstraße, but to the new Ruhbank (Fernsehturm) stop. In September 1998, an extension to Heumaden via Sillenbuch followed. In 1999, the next generation of tram vehicles arrived with the DT 8.10 sets.

In the same year, the extension of the U14 from Mühlhausen to Remseck-Neckargröningen was the first network expansion since the beginning of the Stadtbahn era, compared to the tram network. One year later, on 9 September 2000, the 6.3-kilometre-long new line between Heumaden and Nellingen went into operation. The new peak hour line U8, established at the instigation of the town of Ostfildern, has since been running from Vaihingen to Nellingen via the Weinsteige-Waldau triangle, which was previously only used for commercial purposes. In addition, the now-discontinued event lines U16 (replaced by U19 in 2006), U17 and U18 began operating.

On 22 June 2002, line 2 was the penultimate line to be converted to Stadtbahn operation and at the same time received a new line beyond the previous Obere Ziegelei terminus to Hauptfriedhof. On 14 December of the same year, the previously remaining Berliner Platz–Hölderlinplatz section followed. In the meantime, the U2 ran clockwise through the inner city loop. The late conversion of the U2 is probably due to the complicated route, which made it difficult to create a separate track. A large part of the line is still at street level, and in one place it was even necessary to create a track loop. It was not until 1999 that the upgrade and simultaneous extension to Neugereut was agreed. It was opened on 16 July 2005 with a 10–15 meter deep, 1.1 km (0.68 mi) long tunnel built by mining under the main cemetery (Hauptfriedhof).

==== Conversion of line 15 as the last meter gauge line ====
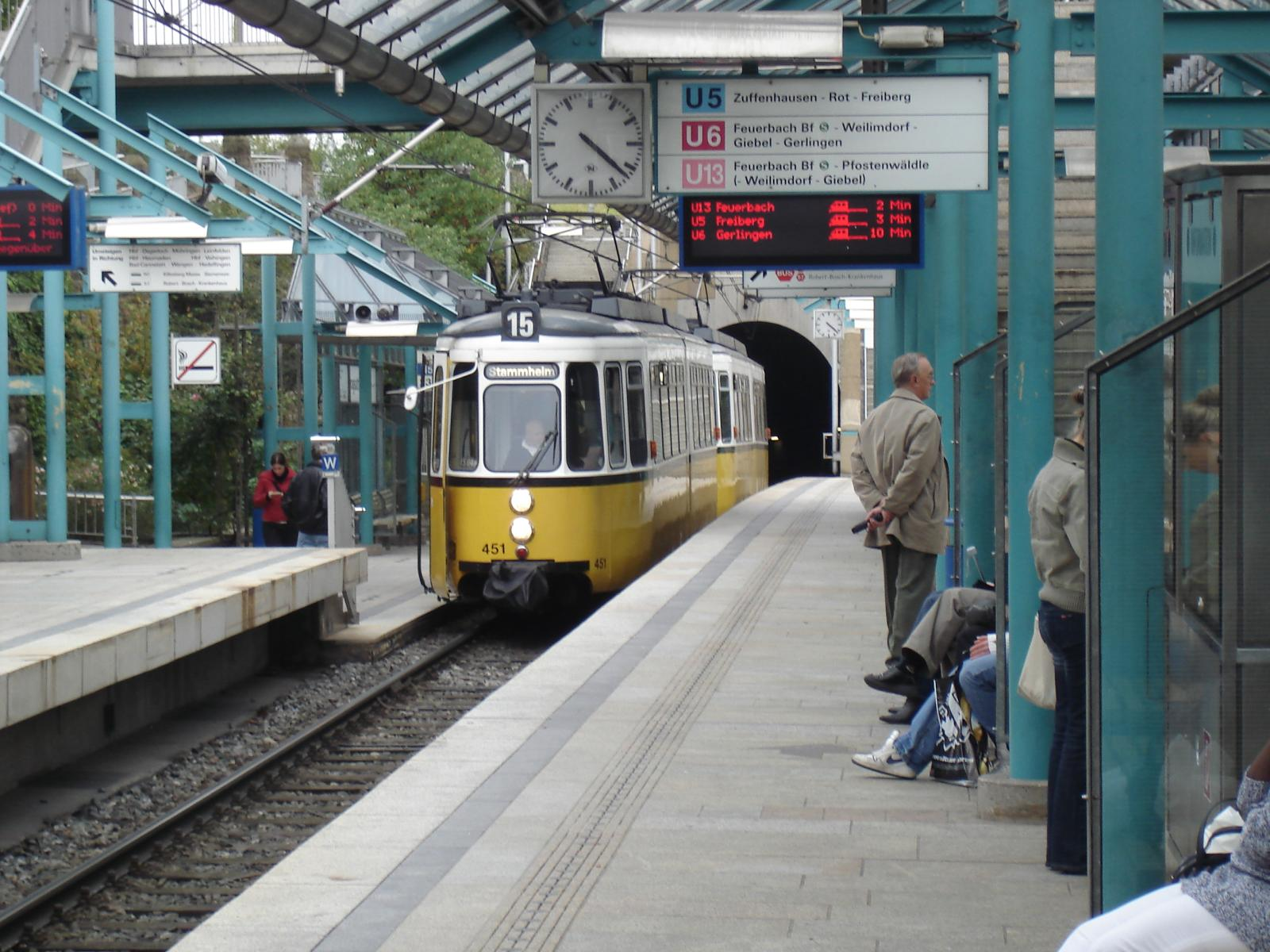
Tram line 15 at the low platform part of the Pragsattel stop, in the foreground the high platform of the stop (2005)

From September 2005, the last metre-gauge section of line 15 was converted to Stadtbahn operation. First, the southern branch from Olgaeck to Ruhbank and the section through the Nordbahnhofviertel were completed while maintaining operations. In December 2007, the U15 went into operation between Ruhbank and Zuffenhausen Kelterplatz. A three-rail track was laid on the two converted sections of the southern branch, which enables vintage car trips with meter-gauge vehicles from the tram museum in Bad Cannstatt via the Nordbahnhof to Ruhbank. From the beginning of 2008 to the end of 2011, the northern branch from Zuffenhausen to Stammheim was converted; the most challenging part of this consisted of a tunnel under Unterländer Straße. On the southern branch between Olgaeck and Ruhbank, the Stadtbahn—like the tram before it—manages a steep gradient of up to 8.5%. This makes this section the steepest standard gauge adhesion track in Europe used by local public transport. Of this, 65 m (213 ft) in altitude are accounted for by the distance between Olgaeck (260 m (280 yd)) and Heidehofstrasse (325 m (355 yd)), i.e. a route length of around 800 m (870 yd). This gives an average gradient of 8.1%, with the maximum being 8.5% on Alexanderstrasse.

The outer branch of the U15 has been in operation through the new tunnel in Zuffenhausen to Stammheim since 10 December 2011. The Stammheim Rathaus and Stammheim stops were merged. Due to the route change between the Kirchtalstraße and Salzwiesenstraße stops, the Zahn-Nopper-Straße stop is no longer available. The Kirchtalstraße stop is the only tunnel stop where trains cannot stop in double sets. Interchange between the Stadtbahn and S-Bahn in Zuffenhausen, which was envisaged in earlier plans, was not implemented because the tunnel section of the Stadtbahn passes under the railway line to Ludwigsburg a considerable distance from the Zuffenhausen S-Bahn station.

==== Further development ====
To date, 14 more tunnels have been built after those mentioned above: Neue Weinsteige (opened in 1987), Degerloch (1990), Feuerbach Wiener Straße (1990), Weilimdorf (1992), Killesberg (1993), under the Botnanger Sattel (1994), Gerlingen (1997), Waldau (1998), Sillenbuch (1999), Ruit (2000), Steinhaldenfeld (2005), Fasanenhof (2010), Zuffenhausen (2011) and Hallschlag (2017). The tunnel between Hauptbahnhof and Stadtbibliothek was replaced in 2016-2017 by new construction in a different location with an additional branch towards the Europaviertel. The total length of the underground routes is around 26 km (16 mi).

With the delivery of the last DT 8.11 tram cars, the SSB owned 164 tram vehicles in 2005. At the timetable change in 2005/06, the U5 line was extended to the north by 650 m (710 yd) to Mönchfeld. At the timetable change in 2010/11, extensive changes were made to the line network and the U6 received a new southern section to the Fasanenhof-Ost industrial estate. From 2013, extensive new construction of the U12 line followed.

In preparation for the 2006 FIFA World Cup, all stops (except Berliner Platz (Hohe Straße)) along the inner-city loop were expanded so that double sets with a length of 80 metres could be used on the event line U11.

As the new long-distance rail tunnel as part of Stuttgart 21 is being built in the area of the new Hauptbahnhof under Heilbronner Strasse at almost the same level as the current Hauptbahnhof–Pragsattel Stadtbahn tunnel, the Stadtbahn route had to be lowered and moved. Parallel to the existing Stadtbahn tunnel, two tunnel tubes were initially excavated in Kriegsberg. The tunnel leading into the city was connected between 18 and 20 November 2016. The tunnel leading out of the city was connected between 7 and 9 April 2017. Since then, the old tunnel has been filled in and the new long-distance rail tunnel has been built over the Stadtbahn tunnel. This measure is being financed from the funds of the Stuttgart 21 project, including reimbursement of costs for possible operational disruptions.

Since the mid-2010s, the SSB has been gradually carrying out major renovations on older sections of the line, with the tracks and operating facilities mostly being completely replaced and some raised platforms also being renewed. As part of this, the last sections of third track outside the routes of the vintage lines are gradually being removed.

As part of the completion of the new line between the Hauptbahnhof and the Staatsgalerie, the remaining sections of the existing tunnel stubs in the direction of the former Staatsgalerie stop will be converted into a turn-back facility in order to allow additional capacity on the inner-city loop.

==== Closure of the Rosenstein Bridge ====
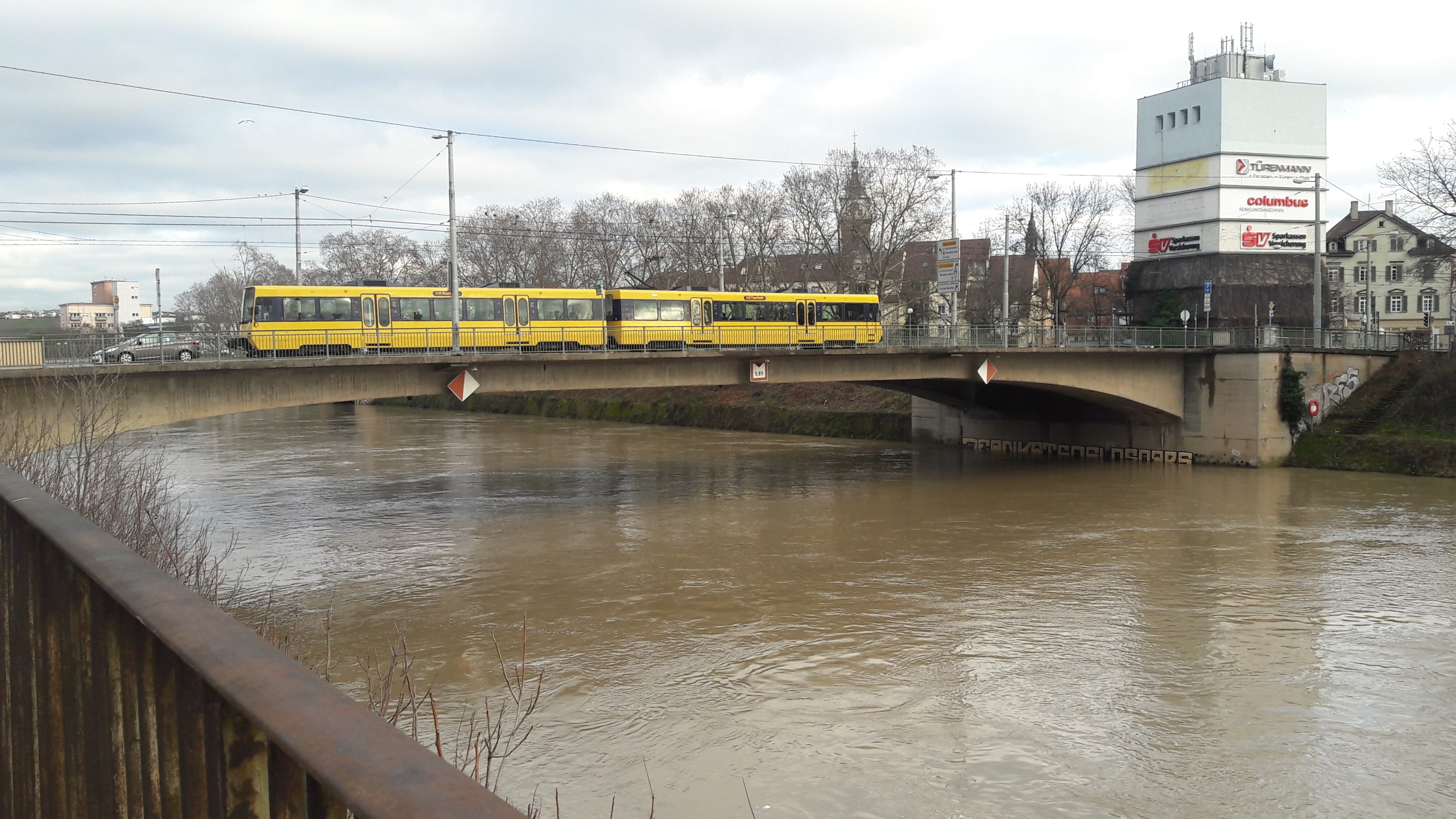
The affected Rosenstein Bridge before its closure (2018)

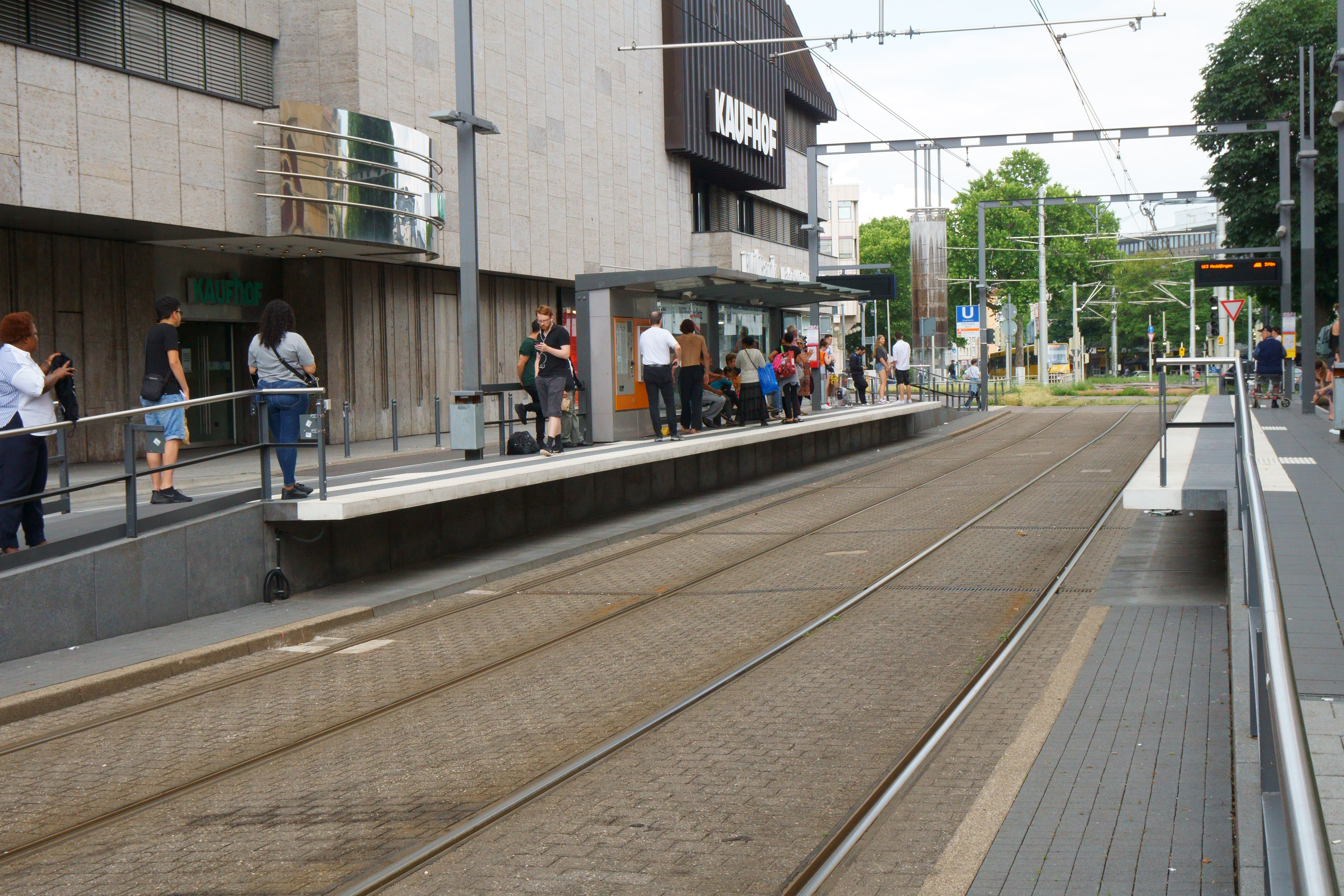
Abandoned Bad Cannstatt Wilhelmsplatz (Badstraße) stop

The Rosenstein Bridge, which connects Cannstatt-Mitte with the Neckarvorstadt, was closed at short notice at the beginning of May 2022 due to extensive problems with the reinforced concrete structure in static load testing. Until a replacement is built in an unspecified period of time, the trams on lines U13 and U16, which regularly run over the bridge, must be diverted via the connecting curve at the Leuze junction between Wilhelma and Mercedesstraße stops. The Neckar is thus crossed via König-Karl Bridge, which is about 600 m upstream. In connection with a previously planned track renewal in Pragstraße, shortly after the closure, the points towards Rosenstein Bridge were cut at the stop of the same name and replaced by simple track curves towards Neckartalstraße. In addition, the tracks on the bridge were dismantled in May 2023. The dismantling of the now unused tracks on the crossing towards the bridge followed in autumn 2023.

The entire route through Badstraße, including the Bad Cannstatt Wilhelmsplatz (Badstraße) stop, will therefore become obsolete and will be closed for an indefinite period of time. The tram route at the stop has meanwhile been tarred over and converted into a road access for Badstraße.

The plan is to demolish the bridge by summer 2024 and then rebuild it as a wider arched bridge by around 2031. The Rosensteinbrücke tram stop, which was previously located on Pragstrasse, is to be relocated to the new bridge to provide better connections to Cannstatt's old town. It has not yet been finally decided whether cars will also be able to drive over the new bridge.

=== Completed projects ===
==== Construction of the U12: routes through the Europaviertel, to Hallschlag and to Dürrlewang ====
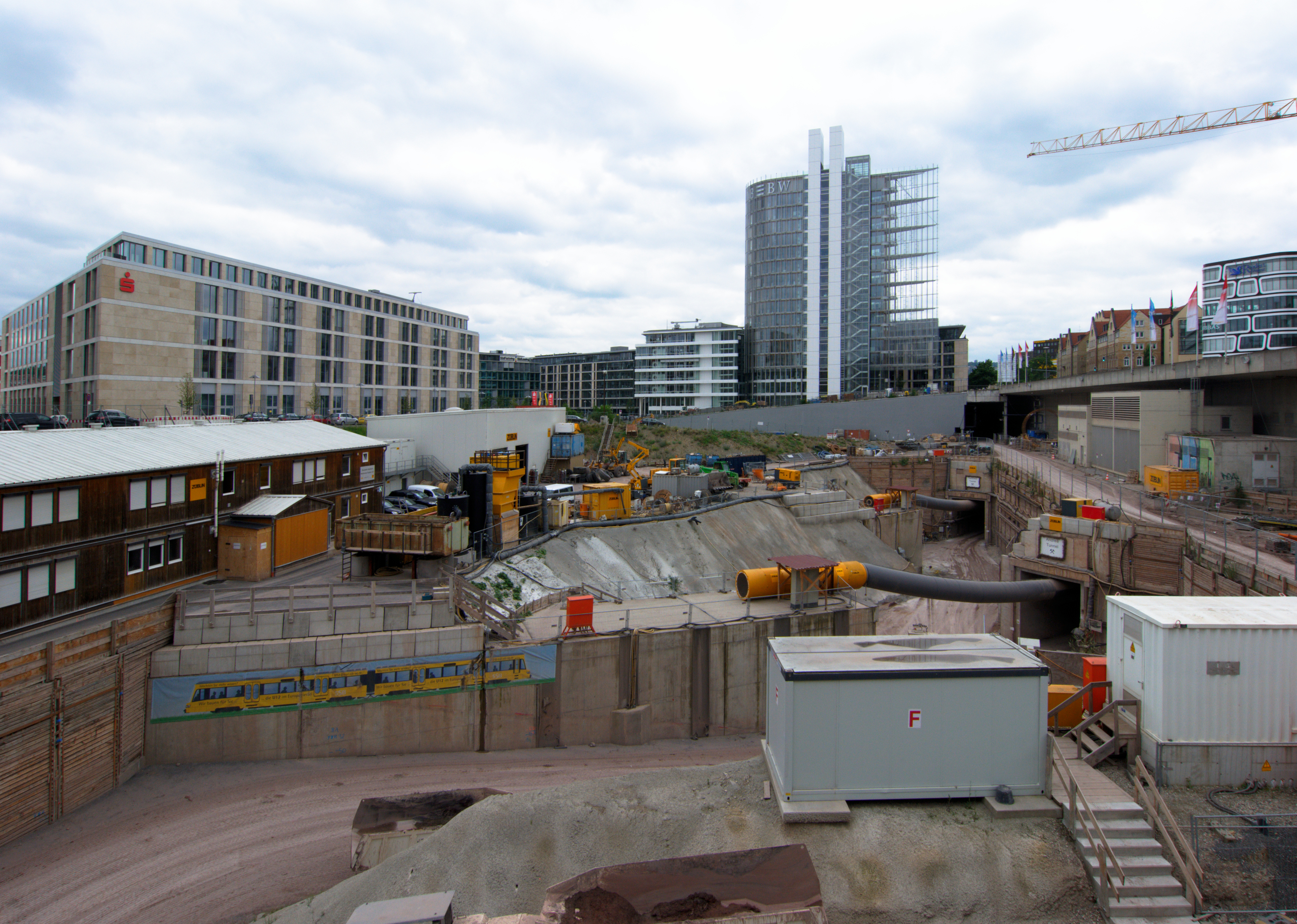
Stadtbahn construction site between Heilbronner Straße and Stadtbibliothek

In addition to the changes in the city centre, the Wallgraben – Dürrlewang route was put into operation with the 2016 network, and the Hauptbahnhof – Budapester Platz – Milchhof and Hallschlag – Bottroper Straße – Wagrainäcker sections of the U12 were put into operation with the 2018 network. Since 2017, the U12 Stadtbahn line has been running with double sets from Dürrlewang in the south via the city centre, through Europaviertel, the Nordbahnhofviertel and Hallschlag down into the Neckar valley to Remseck in the north. Since then, the U14 no longer runs to Remseck, but only to Mühlhausen. The extension of the southern branch between Dürrlewang and Wallgraben went into operation on 13 May 2016. Initially, the U14 was to end at the Max-Eyth-See, but in March 2013 it was decided that it would run to Mühlhausen. For this purpose, a reversing track with a 40-metre-long platform was set up at this stop.

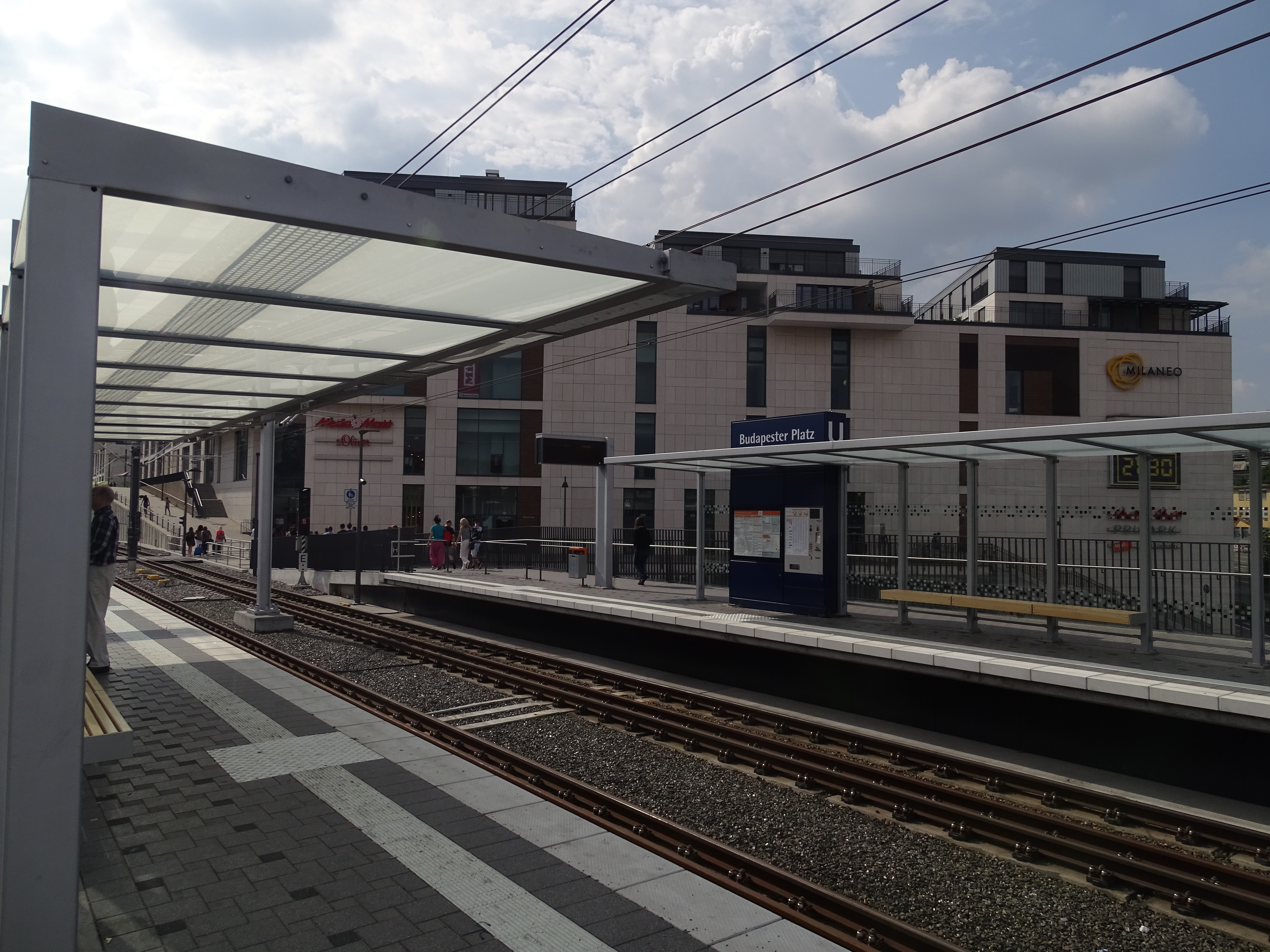
Budapester Platz stop

The sections of track added in 2016 and 2017 are primarily intended to provide better connections to the previously neglected district of Hallschlag, the Europaviertel currently under construction, the planned Rosensteinquartier and other new development areas planned as part of Stuttgart 21 on the existing tracks. The entire route is designed for 80-metre long trains.

The first new section of the U12 was the 2,040 m (2,230 yd) long construction section between the Löwentor and Hallschlag stops, which was completed in September 2013. The route runs mostly in the middle of Löwentorstrasse between the two lanes on the green strip that has been kept clear for many years. Around 200 trees were felled on the former green strip to build the route. Eight larger trees were saved and replanted. Young trees are being replanted on both sides of the lanes, creating an avenue on large parts of Löwentorstrasse. Since then, there has only been one lane for private motorised traffic in each direction, and a cycle lane has been added. The three intersections at Hunklinge, Züricher Strasse and Auf der Steig have been converted into roundabouts. During the construction of the Pragsattel tunnel, the tracks in the area of the Löwentor intersection were laid as preliminary work. The construction section included the four stops at Löwentor, Züricher Strasse, Riethmüllerhaus and Hallschlag. They are equipped with 80-metre-long raised platforms to enable later operation in double sets.

The Stadtbahn tunnel between the Hauptbahnhof (Arnulf-Klett-Platz) and Stadtbibliothek stops was rebuilt in a different location due to Stuttgart 21. The U12 uses this new tunnel until shortly before the Stadtbibliothek stop and then branches off underground towards Budapester Platz. In the Europaviertel, the U12 line runs largely in a tunnel and, after passing under the Stadtbibliothek (city library) at Mailänder Platz, reaches the surface on the east side via a ramp, crosses Lissabonner Straße and reaches the Budapester Platz stop (planning name Wolframstraße) on a bridge. The 145-metre-long bridge then crosses over the Wolframstraße/Nordbahnhofstraße intersection and along the side of Nordbahnhofstraße to the Friedhofstraße/Nordbahnhofstraße intersection. There it connects to the ground-level Stadtbahn tracks in the middle of Nordbahnhofstraße. In the 1990s, the U12 was scheduled to be commissioned by 2001, with construction starting in 1998.

According to the plan, the U15 line was also supposed to run along this route. After the SSB initiated a change to the planning approval decision in early 2008, the route runs above ground in a lateral position on Nordbahnhofstrasse and swings into the middle position near Friedhofstrasse and connects to the Milchhof stop. Originally, an underpass at the Nordbahnhofstrasse/Rosensteinstrasse intersection was planned. The reason for the change in planning was overly high traffic forecasts of up to 18,000 vehicles per day for Rosensteinstrasse, as well as concerns at the political level about a premature closure of the existing branch on Friedhofstrasse. With the commissioning of the new section, the section on Friedhofstrasse and the existing Pragfriedhof stop, which were already intended as temporary measures when they were set up, were closed on 2 December 2017. In order to continue to offer heritage tram service with the former meter-gauge trams, the new line through the Europaviertel is designed as a three-rail track.

In another section, the U12 connects to the U14 line in the north. From the Hallschlag stop, the line runs in a trough south of Löwentorstraße and reaches the new Bottroper Straße stop. This is followed by a 500-metre-long tunnel that takes it into the Neckar valley and under the Stuttgart-Untertürkheim–Kornwestheim railway. Austraße is then crossed with a newly built bridge and joins the U14 line at the Neckar bridge. This section of the line is around 1.1 km long. The next stop is Wagrainäcker. The gap was closed when the timetable changed on 9 December 2017, with small opening celebrations and a parallel journey.

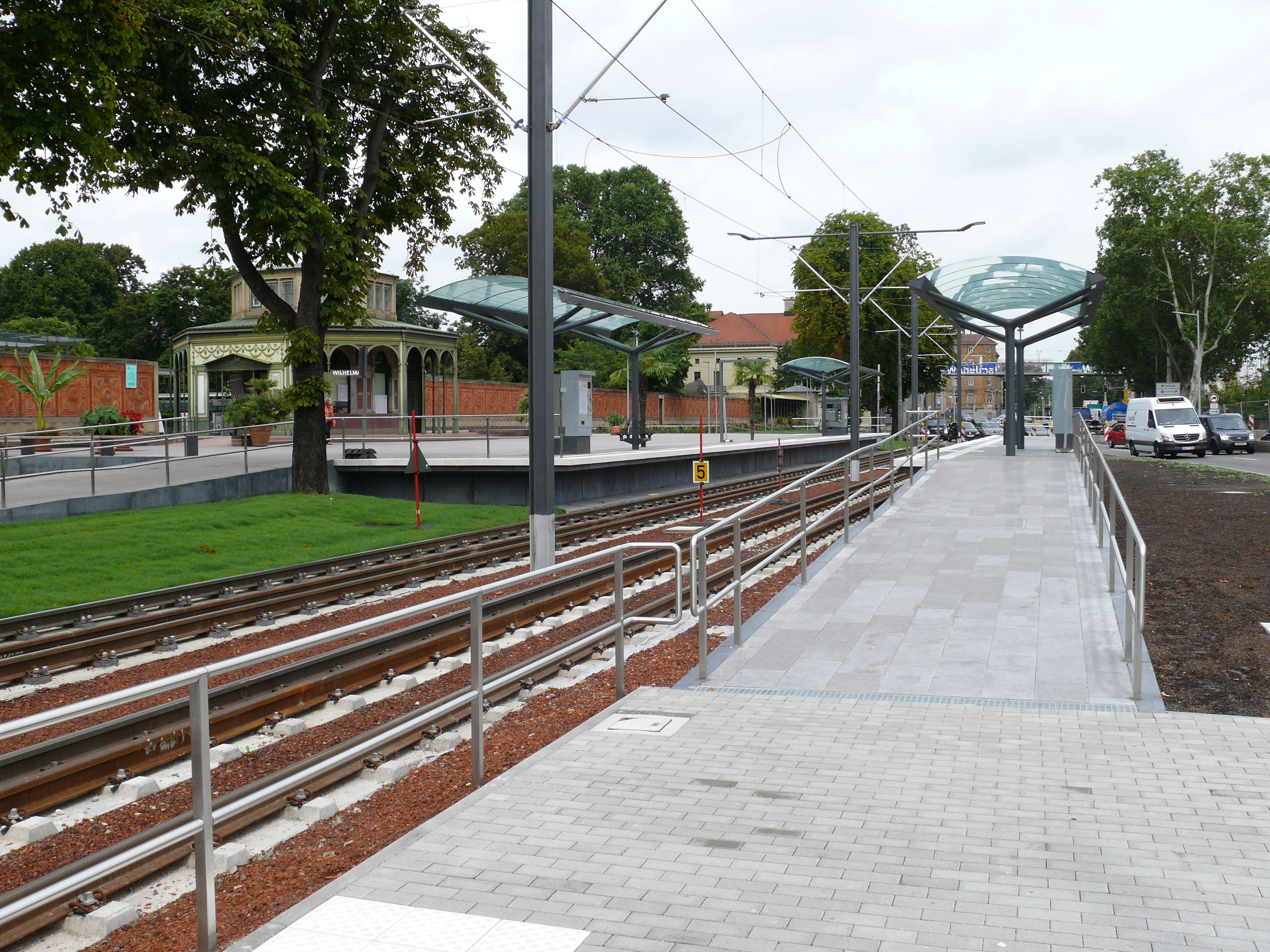
New Wilhelma stop in front of the main entrance

==== Reconstruction of Wilhelma and Rosenstein Park ====
Due to the construction of the Rosenstein Tunnel for the B10, the Wilhelma stop was rebuilt in 2016 in a different location, directly in front of the main entrance to the Wilhelma. Likewise, in May 2019, the Rosensteinpark stop was rebuilt in its final location between the two tunnel ramps on Pragstrasse. Due to the excavation pit for the southeastern tunnel portal, the line between Wilhelma and Mineralbäder or Mercedesstrasse ran on a single track over a temporary bridge and had to be relocated again after its completion. Since summer 2020, all lines in the Neckarstrasse, König-Karls bridge and Leuzebad areas have returned to double-track operation. After completion of the work on the New Rosenstein Bridge, only a few remaining works remain to be done.

If the old Rosenstein Bridge, which will then be redundant, is demolished after the Stuttgart 21 station project has been commissioned—something about which there is still no clarity—further temporary structures for the U14 will be necessary during the demolition period.

==== Extension to airport and exhibition centre (U6-South) ====
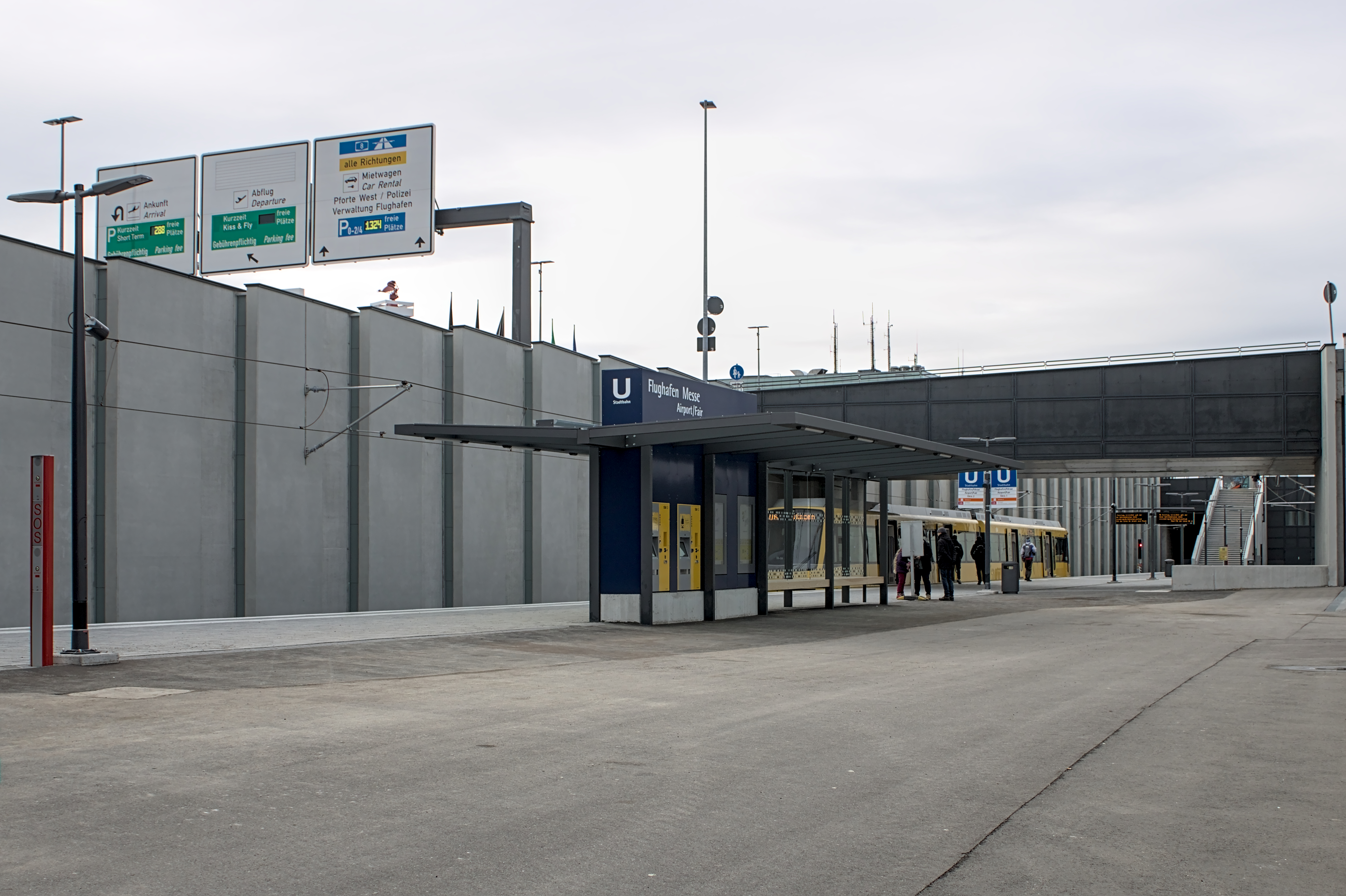
Flughafen/Messe stop

The U6 was extended by just over three kilometres from the Fasanenhof Ost industrial estate to the Stuttgart trade fair and the airport. Just south of the former terminus Fasanenhof Schelmenwasen, the line crosses the A 8 after a short gradient of 8.5% with a bridge east of Stuttgart-Degerloch, which was later awarded first prize by the Austrian Steel Construction Association for infrastructure projects, the German Engineering Prize and the German Bridge Construction Prize. The route then runs along the B 27 with the Echterdingen Stadionstraße and Messe West stops. It then runs north of Flughafenstraße to the Flughafen/Messe Ost terminus near the existing S-Bahn station and the planned Stuttgart Airport long-distance train station.

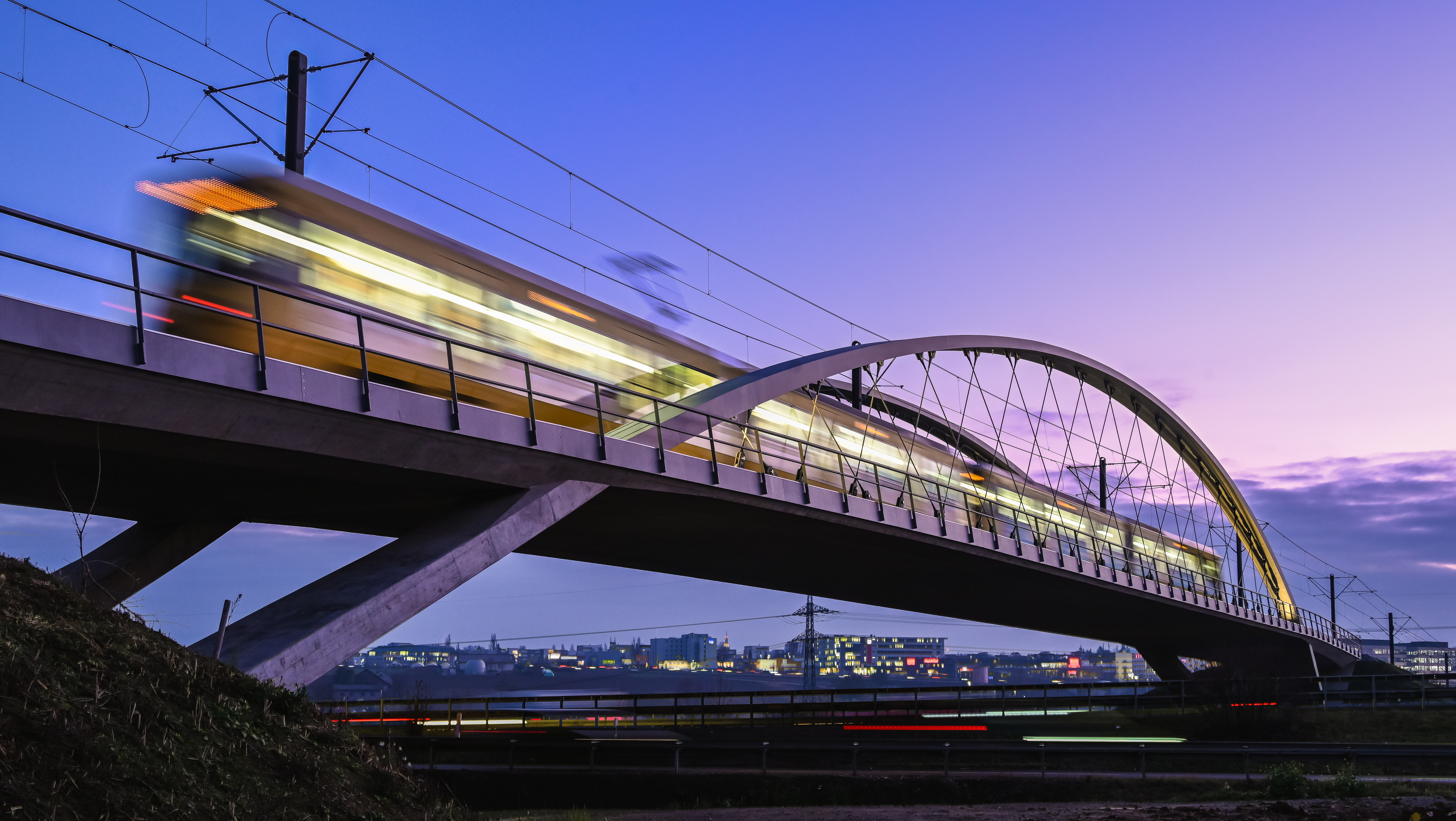
Bridge over the A 8

On 14 November 2012, the state of Baden-Württemberg decided to fund the U6. The state therefore covered 20% of the eligible costs, and the federal government 60%. In the cost-benefit analysis, the U6 extension performed better than a Messe (trade fair) connection with the U5 from Leinfelden. Therefore, the U6 extension was pursued, although both routes would be economical. In late summer 2013, the negotiators of the cities of Stuttgart and Leinfelden-Echterdingen, the state government, the SSB and the district of Esslingen agreed on the financing. In September 2013, the regional assembly approved the agreements and thus approved the construction of the U5, the U6 and the S2. Work to clear the construction site began in October 2017. The cost forecast was originally €70m and was revised to €94m in 2016 and €101.3m in 2017. In 2019, the SSB reported a further cost increase of 25 to 30 percent.

The official commissioning took place on 12 December 2021 with the timetable change. The first public service took place on 11 December 2021. Afterwards, at around 4 p.m., the line was opened to the public.

=== Route chronology ===
In 1989, the U1, U3 and U14 tram lines that had been introduced up to that point were given the letter U in front of them to distinguish them from the S-Bahn and tram lines. The E line to Cannstatter Wasen and the stadium was given its current name U11 in 1994.

Opening	Section	Line	Explanation
1 May 1985	Plieningen – Möhringen Bf	U3	Preliminary operation
28 September 1985	Möhringen Bf – Vaihingen Bf	U3	U3 conversion
19 April 1986	Vaihingen Bf – Fellbach Lutherkirche	U1	U1 conversion
12 July 1986	Mineralbäder – Mühlhausen; Staatsgalerie – Berliner Platz – Österreichischer Platz	U14	U14 conversion
24 September 1988	Mercedesstraße – Cannstatter Wasen	E	Route to Cannstatter Wasen
30 September 1989	Stöckach – Raitelsberg – Hedelfingen; Berliner Platz (Liederhalle) – Vogelsang	U9	U9 conversion
3 November 1990	Pragsattel – Freiberg; Pragsattel – Feuerbach Pfostenwäldle; Pragsattel – Möhringen Bf; Vaihinger Straße – Leinfelden Bf	U5 U6	U5/U6 conversion
26 September 1992	Feuerbach Pfostenwäldle – Giebel	U6	U6 extension to Giebel
19 April 1993	Eckartshaldenweg – Killesberg	U7	Route to Killesberg
13 August 1993	Cannstatter Wasen – Neckarstadion (heute Neckarpark (Stadion))	E	Route to Neckarstadion
3 October 1993	Giebel – Gerlingen Siedlung	U6	U6 extension to Gerlingen Siedlung
24 September 1994	Untertürkheim Bf – Wasenstraße; Wangener-/Landhausstraße – Ostendplatz – Bergfriedhof; Vogelsang – Botnang	U4	U4 conversion
1 June 1997	Gerlingen Siedlung – Gerlingen	U6	U6 extension to Gerlingen
13 September 1997	Pragsattel – Bad Cannstatt Wilhelmsplatz; Augsburger Platz – Schlotterbeckstraße	U13	U13 conversion
27 March 1998	Schlotterbeckstraße – Wasenstraße	U13	U13 conversion
23 May 1998	Bopser – Ruhbank	U7	Route to Ruhbank
22 May 1999	Mühlhausen – Neckargröningen	U14	U14 extension to Neckargröningen
11 September 1999	Ruhbank – Heumaden	U7	U7 extension to Heumaden
9 September 2000	Heumaden – Nellingen	U7 U8	U7/U8 extension to Nellingen
22 June 2002	Bad Cannstatt Wilhelmsplatz – Hauptfriedhof	U2	U2 conversion
14 December 2002	Berliner Platz (Hohe Straße) – Hölderlinplatz	U2	U2 conversion
16 July 2005	Hauptfriedhof – Neugereut	U2	U2 extension to Neugereut
11 December 2005	Freiberg – Mönchfeld	U5	U5 extension to Mönchfeld
8 December 2007	Löwentor – Nordbahnhof – Türlenstraße; Olgaeck – Eugensplatz – Ruhbank	U15	U15 conversion
11 December 2010	Möhringen Freibad – Fasanenhof Schelmenwasen	U6	U6 extension to Fasanenhof
10 December 2011	Zuffenhausen – Stammheim	U15	U15 conversion/extension to Stammheim
14 September 2013	Löwentor – Hallschlag	U12	Route to Hallschlag
13 May 2016	Wallgraben – Dürrlewang	U12	Route to Dürrlewang
20 November 2016 (towards the city), 9 April 2017 (away from the city)	Hauptbahnhof – Stadtbibliothek (construction of new tunnel in a different location)	U5 U6 U7 U12 U15	Construction of Heilbronner Straße tunnel
9 December 2017	Hauptbahnhof – Milchhof; Hallschlag – Aubrücke	U12	U12 extension to Neckartal
10 December 2017	Charlottenplatz – Staatsgalerie (Reconstruction of the tunnel at a different location)	U1 U2 U4 U9 U11 U14	Network 2018
11 December 2021	Fasanenhof – Echterdingen – Messe/Flughafen	U6	U6 extension to the airport
10 December 2023	Hauptbahnhof – Staatsgalerie (reconstruction of the tunnel at a different location)	U1 U9 U11	Network 2024

== Projects ==
Various projects to expand the Stadtbahn are under construction or being developed. Many more have been discussed.

=== Projects under construction ===
==== Extension from Leinfelden station to Neuer Markt (U5 south) ====
The U5 was extended by one station from Leinfelden station to the provisional terminus at Neuer Markt (formerly Markomannenstraße). In March 2022, the approximately 660 m (720 yd) long route was given planning approval by the Stuttgart Regional Council. Construction work began in spring 2022 and is expected to take around two years in total, with commissioning on 17 October 2024. Track construction work began in February 2024, but was previously delayed due to the loose soil and the more complex processes required. The line will be built above ground with a slab track as a grassed track. The new stop is planned to be double-tracked with two 40-metre-long side platforms, which have been under construction since May 2024, but is designed for later expansion to 80 metres in double traction. This can be done without additional work on the track. The platform heading into the city will be connected at the same level with the adjacent new district square.

An operating building for the power supply and a single-track area for service and emergency vehicles are to be built in this area. During operation, a 20-minute cycle with the U5 line and 30 minutes during off-peak times is still planned for the section of the line. Behind the terminus, a single-track turning facility is planned with the option of extending the line towards Echterdingen. The previous turnback facility at Leinfelden station, which was built as preliminary work, will also be used and thus dismantled. The costs for the entire project are expected to amount to €11.9 million. As part of this project, the remaining southern branch of the U5 from Möhringen Freibad was completely rebuilt during a two-month closure from July 2024 to September 2024.

==== Capacity increase on the U1 ====
The platforms on the Fellbach – Heslach Vogelrain section are to be extended to allow the operation of 80-metre-long double sets. The need on the Heslach Vogelrain – Vaihingen section is lower, so this section will continue to be served by 40-metre-long trains of the U14. Only the above-ground stops need to be rebuilt, as the platforms of the tunnel stations were built for 80-meter-long trains. The total station length has been 120 metres since construction.

Some above-ground stops were already extended in the 2000s for the operation 80-metre long U11 trains. The others can probably simply be extended; this was done at Cannstatter Wilhelmsplatz in 2018. The platform extension was originally supposed to be completed in 2016, but was postponed due to a lack of financial resources. The required capacity was initially created by the U16 reinforcement line (Fellbach – Bad Cannstatt – Feuerbach – Giebel) and the now discontinued express bus line X1.

After planning was resumed in 2017, completion was initially planned for 2023, but was delayed until 2026. Construction is to be carried out in two phases. Construction of the first, particularly busy, section of the line began in March 2023 with the eight stops on the northern branch (Bad Cannstatt – Uff-Kirchhof – Fellbach Schwabenlandhalle). This will cost €14 million and is to be completed by the end of 2024. Three stops are to be rebuilt at a time, and the Stadtbahn service is to be maintained continuously. At Augsburger Platz, there is no space to extend the platform due to the bridge and curves. When construction begins in June 2024, the stop will therefore be moved a good 100 m out of town to the straight Nürnberger Straße (the previous stop will then be dismantled), thus moving closer to the existing Nürnberger Straße stop and the Nürnberger Straße S-Bahn station. The original idea was to merge the two stops and replace them with a convenient transfer structure to the S-Bahn in the area of the railway bridge.

The second construction phase is significantly more complicated and is therefore not to be started until 2025 (with completion planned for the end of 2026). It includes the difficult, curved stops at Bihlplatz, Erwin-Schoettle-Platz and Südheimer Platz as well as the eastern terminus at Fellbach Lutherkirche. Their reconstruction is considered problematic in terms of urban development, as a simple extension of the platform in both directions (east and west) would interrupt important pedestrian and cycle paths as well as sight lines. In view of this, after lengthy discussion, it is planned to completely rebuild the Lutherkirche stop about 100 metres further west, as part of a planned redesign of the surrounding area by the city. Construction is not scheduled to begin here until mid-2025 at the earliest. Due to the difficult urban environment of the remaining platforms in this second construction phase, an accompanying urban design concept was drawn up to better integrate the platforms into the urban space. During this construction project, the Stadtbahn service between Marienplatz and Heslach Vogelrain will have to be interrupted for around three months in spring 2025 and a replacement bus service will operate instead. The planning approval procedure for the first three stops in Stuttgart-Süd was initiated in summer 2024.

The division into construction phases also means that the U1 will be put into operation in sections. After completion of the first construction phase, it will either run from Fellbach via the inner-city loop or turn around in the new turning facility at the main station. The extension to Heslach Vogelrain will finally take place when the second construction phase is completed. In the meantime, it is planned to create a new, temporary Stadtbahn line to serve the section from the Hauptbahnhof to Heslach Vogelrain.

What the future of the then partially obsolete U16 reinforcement line will look like has not yet been finally clarified. In the RVP 2020, the platform extension is classified as measure 118 with the "highest urgency".

=== Firmly planned projects ===
==== Pflugmühle curve connecting Vaihingen/Dürrlewang to Airport/Trade Fair and Leinfelden (U17/U18) ====
The Pflugmühle curve between the SSB-Zentrum and Rohrer Weg stops, which was completed in 2022, enables a direct route from Vaihingen and Dürrlewang to Flughafen/Messe (Airport/Trade Fair) and to Leinfelden. In May 2018, a line from Flughafen/Messe to Dürrlewang (U17) was mentioned for the first time, which would make this possible. This would allow the Vaihingen/Möhringen industrial area to be connected to the airport without having to change trains. The 2023 action plan "Sustainable and innovative mobility in Stuttgart" also lists the possibility of a "U18" that could connect the industrial area with Leinfelden.

On 3 December 2019, the planning status was presented to the Stuttgart City Council's technical committee. The 225-metre-long double-track line was estimated to cost €11.3m due to extensive changes in the Möhringen signal box. The planning approval decision for the project was issued in February 2021. The line went into operation in the first half of 2022 and has since been used as an operational line to better connect the depot.

The scheduled service as U17 between Dürrlewang and the Flughafen/Messe is to begin no later than the commissioning of the Stuttgart Airport long-distance train station, which is planned for the end of 2025, as part of the Stuttgart 21 rail project, as the necessary passenger potential will then be available. However, initially only operation during peak hours and at 20-minute intervals is planned.

Since the S-Bahn line to the airport has to be interrupted for at least a year for the construction of the long-distance station, various parties are demanding that the start of operations of the line from Vaihingen station to Flughafen/Messe be brought forward to spring 2024. The SSB now considers this to be possible, provided that the city of Stuttgart takes over the financing and commissioning. On the other hand, the initial situation has since changed due to the inclusion of the Pfaffensteig tunnel in the planning.

==== Line to Hausen and Ditzingen, including fourth depot (U13 north) ====
Of all the Stadtbahn projects, the fourth depot has the highest priority because the three existing ones can no longer accommodate additional sets and without them no improvements to the service would be possible, regardless of whether it be increased frequency, more 80 m (260 ft)-long trains or line extensions.

In the summer of 2016, the search for a location began throughout the Weilimdorf district (including Wolfbusch, Bergheim, Giebel, Hausen and Weilimdorf Nord). Of an initial 13 locations, 7 were examined in more detail. After intensive public participation from January to May 2018, the site near Ditzingen-Ost on the city border with Ditzingen was selected in October 2018. The 4.8 km (3.0 mi)-long access route, which will also serve as a new Stadtbahn line to Hausen and Ditzingen, is to branch off from the existing line (U6/U16) behind the Rastatter Straße stop, crossing the B 295, and follow the B 295 in a cutting. The first stop, Ditzinger Straße (originally Flachter Straße) with outside platforms is planned at the B 295/Flachter Straße/Gerlinger Straße intersection. The Weilimdorf S-Bahn station and the adjacent commercial area are not to be directly connected for cost reasons. For transfer passengers, a 300 m (980 ft)-long walk will be created from a new Weilimdorf Bahnhof stop with a central platform on the B 295. The route then splits into two main tracks and two access tracks to the depot. The access tracks are to be provided with an operating platform. After a curve to the west, the line will initially run parallel to the depot and then, after merging into an exit track for the depot, will run past it in a further curve to the south and reach the Hausen stop there. The completion of the route up to that point, including the depot, is scheduled for the end of 2027.

From there, the line is to be extended to the Ditzingen Süd/Schuckertstraße industrial estate (with companies such as Trumpf and Thales) to a stop at Ditzingen Hülben, with intermediate stops at Ditzingen Schuckertstraße and Ditzingen Süd. In the medium term, an extension to the Ditzingen S-Bahn station is planned, and the city of Ditzingen is fundamentally interested in this. The city of Stuttgart has commissioned the SSB with further planning, and completion of the line to the Ditzingen industrial estate is scheduled for the end of 2028.

A competition was announced for the architectural design of the depot, from which the renowned architectural firm Auer Weber emerged as the first prize winner on 23 June 2021. According to the wishes of the client SSB and the city of Stuttgart, the firm was also commissioned with the further planning. The depot is to have a large storage hall with space for 47 trams, a workshop (6,000 m^{2} (65,000 sq ft)) and a service and social building with a signal box (2,400 m^{2} (26,000 sq ft)), which are to be covered together with a green roof of around 19,000 m^{2} (200,000 sq ft), on which a 4,300 m^{2} (46,000 sq ft) photovoltaic system is to be built. The entire site is to cover 4.8 ha (12 acres) and provide work for around 200 people.

The initial cost of the entire project, including the depot and the line to the Ditzingen industrial estate, was €130m, of which €70m was for the depot. In 2023, there was talk of an increase in costs to around €440m, of which €230m was for the depot, due in part to an outdoor geothermal plant, wastewater heat exchangers and an energy centre for Hausen. There was also a cost-increasing planning change in the area of the line branch: originally, the line was to branch off via a triangular junction below the bridge over the B 295 from the current existing line. However, in order to avoid cutting up the fields and allotments there, a branch from the direction of Stuttgart is now planned before the bridge with its own bridge and another single-track branch from the direction of Gerlingen.

The construction of the route to Hausen is expected to cost €140m and the extension to Ditzingen Hülben a further €70m. The financing is provided by the SSB up to Hausen and further to Hülben via the city of Ditzingen. Of the estimated costs for the line, the federal government will cover 75 percent and the state 12.5 percent; for the depot, the state will provide 50 percent of the funding. As a pure access route to the depot, the line would not have been eligible for funding. As the depot and line are located in a regional green belt, a target deviation procedure has been initiated, and the land use plan must also be changed. The draft planning for the project was completed in the first quarter of 2023. The planning approval procedure was initiated by the Stuttgart Regional Council in June 2024. The start of construction of the depot together with the line to Hausen is expected for spring 2027, subject to a planning approval decision by December 2025.

The connection of the district of Hausen to the Stadtbahn network was originally supposed to be achieved by an approximately 3.1 km (1.9 mi)-long extension of the U13, starting from the then terminus at Giebel, flush with the street through Rappachstraße, along Gerlinger Straße and Hausenring to the northern development boundary of Hausen (Straße Beim Fasanengarten) and further across open fields to the S-Bahn station at Weilimdorf. This is how the line is still shown (as of January 2019) in the RVP 2020. However, this route will no longer be pursued in the course of determining the location for the fourth depot.

==== Möhringen curve for city centre – Plieningen line (U25) ====
A direct connection is planned between the Plieningen district and Stuttgart city centre. This requires the construction of a curve ("Möhringer Kurve") between the Sigmaringer Straße and Riedsee stops, which would mean that the previously change required at the Möhringen Bahnhof stop will no longer be necessary. The route that has been kept free for this purpose can be clearly seen in the gap between the student residences and the retail supermarket as well as the Probststraße bridge over the Stadtbahn.

The resulting direct Killesberg–Plieningen line running every 20 minutes (in the gap between the U5 service between Killesberg and Leinfelden) was temporarily referred to internally as U5b, since 2022 it has been officially known as U25. Originally, the SSB planned to implement it in 2023. Later, in the medium-term development plan, the commissioning of the curve, including this line, was planned by the end of 2025 at the earliest. In 2022, the SSB suggested a two-year delay until 2027 due to longer approval procedures and the necessary noise and species protection. The resistance of Stuttgart municipal representatives, especially for the Killesberg, where a more frequent 10-minute cycle is demanded, was countered with a planned partial commissioning of the U25 on the Killesberg–Möhringen Bf section as early as the end of 2025 and an extension to Plieningen via the new curve in 2027. The students of the University of Hohenheim are also demanding faster implementation, so the 2023 project took first place in the online voting for the Stuttgart citizens' budget.

The original plan envisaged a grade-separated solution between the curve and the path to the dormitory in the rail triangle. The U3 tracks would have had to be laid in a cutting and the Rembrandtstrasse level crossing would have had to be tunnelled under. This would have meant that the U3 would have had to be shut down for up to two years. A new plan, which would have less impact on the existing tram service, envisages the path to the dormitory crossing the tram tracks using a level crossing, which would significantly minimise construction costs. However, this requires a large adjustment of the elevation in the supermarket and dormitory area. Even with this solution, significant, but operationally lesser, restrictions on the tram service are to be expected, as the track elevation of the U5/U6/U8/U12 and U3 tracks would have to be adjusted.

In all plans, two sets of points and crossings must be installed on each section of the line during ongoing operations. The two sets of points will emit noise and are located in a very noise-sensitive environment, so the issue of noise protection must be addressed more closely, both legally and practically. Further plans are in progress and a cost-benefit analysis has been commissioned.

==== Extension from Leinfelden to Echterdingen (U5 south) ====
The plan is to extend the U5 line, which is currently under construction to the temporary terminus of Neuer Markt, to the town of Echterdingen. The then metre-gauge line to Echterdingen Hinterhof (at Martin-Luther-Straße) was closed and dismantled in 1990, but its route was kept free. An older study confirms that the reconstruction has a cost-benefit factor above one (a positive economic return). At the request of the Leinfelden-Echterdingen municipal council, the SSB will take this extension into account in the further development of the Stadtbahn network.

In March 2023, the SSB announced that it would begin construction in 2027 (if planning approval were to begin in 2025) and that it would be completed by the end of 2029. The plan is to extend the line beyond the former Hinterhof terminus to Zeppelinplatz (a central square at the corner of Hauptstrasse and Kanalstrasse). To enable the construction of the line, Max-Lang-Strasse, along which the Stadtbahn line is to pass under the Rohr-Filderstadt railway line, must be completely relocated. In addition, the SSB is in discussions with the town about possible stops. The line is included and shown in the regional transport plan (RVP 2020) up to Echterdingen Hinterhof (1.6 km). The Leinfelden-Echterdingen town administration considers completion by 2032 to be more realistic given the necessary relocation of Max-Lang-Strasse.

Further on, a possible underground extension to the outskirts of the city, from there on the surface to the planned Gewerbegebiet Echterdingen-Ost (industrial park) and from there to Airport/Messe and/or towards Filderstadt is possible. Airport/Messe is now served by the extended U6, which is why an extension of the U5 beyond Echterdingen Hinterhof is unlikely in the near future. However, the extension from Echterdingen Hinterhof to Gewerbegebiet Echterdingen Ost is shown in the land use plan (FNP) of the town of Leinfelden-Echterdingen.

==== Extension from Neckarpark to Mercedes-Benz Welt (U19 south) ====
It is planned to extend the U19 line from the Neckarpark/Stadion terminus by about 1.3 km to Mercedes-Benz Werkstor ("factory gate") and to Mercedes-Benz Welt ("world"). Even though the then mayor of Stuttgart, Fritz Kuhn, was open to the project, according to the SSB, it would hardly have been possible to implement it before 2021, as the planning would have been complex and the SSB planners would have already been fully occupied with other projects.

In view of the problem of fine dust, this project was given high priority in 2016. The route up to Mercedes-Benz Welt is also included and shown in the RVP 2020. The project has been in the draft planning stage since summer 2019. The completion date of 2025 envisaged in the local transport plan has been postponed to 2026 due to requirements from the 2024 European Football Championship and depending on the very complex planning (taking into account the opening of the Neckarpark and the evacuation of the Neckarstadion) and the necessary planning permission.

== See also ==
- Stuttgarter Straßenbahnen AG
- Stuttgart Rack Railway
- Standseilbahn Stuttgart
- Verkehrs- und Tarifverbund Stuttgart (Stuttgart Transit and Tariff Association)
