= SSB DT 8 =

Light rail vehicle operated on the Stuttgart Stadtbahn in Germany

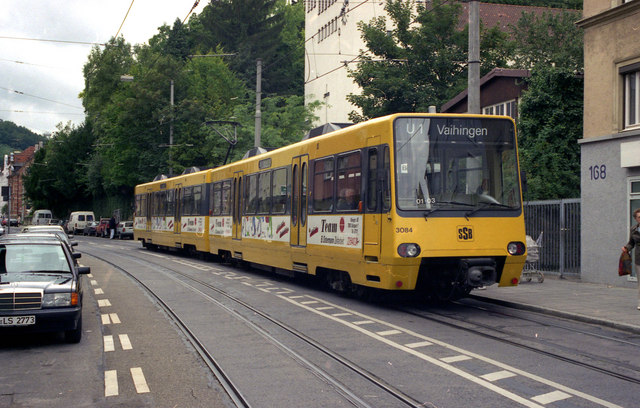
- DT 8 street running in September 1995
- In service: 1985–present
- Manufacturer: Duewag (DT8.4–DT8.9); Siemens/ADtranz (DT8.10); Bombardier (DT8.11); Stadler (DT8.12–DT8.15)
- Refurbished: 2007–2017 (DT8.5–DT8.9)
- Number in service: 204 sets (As of 2019)
- Number preserved: 2 cars
- Formation: 2 cars per trainset
- Capacity: 108 seated, 138 standing (DT8.10); 106 seated, 144 standing (DT8.12)

Specifications
- Train length: 38,050 mm (124 ft 10 1/16 in); 39,110 mm (128 ft 3 3/4 in) (DT8.12)
- Car length: 18,400 mm (60 ft 4 7/16 in)
- Width: 2,650 mm (8 ft 8 5/16 in)
- Height: 3,715 mm (12 ft 2 1/4 in)
- Floor height: 1,000 mm (39 3/8 in)
- Doors: 2 pairs per car (per side)
- Wheel diameter: 74 cm (29 in) (new); 66 cm (26 in) (worn)
- Maximum speed: 80 km/h (50 mph)
- Steep gradient: 9%
- Power output: 4 × 222 kW (298 hp); 8 × 130 kW (170 hp) (DT8.12)
- Acceleration: 1.3 m/s/s (2.9 mph/s)
- Deceleration: 1.3 m/s/s (2.9 mph/s)
- Electric system(s): 750 V DC overhead catenary
- Current collector(s): Pantograph
- Minimum turning radius: 50 m (160 ft)
- Coupling system: Scharfenberg
- Track gauge: 1,435 mm (4 ft 8 1/2 in) standard gauge

The DT 8, also known as S-DT 8, is a type of light rail vehicle used on the Stuttgart Stadtbahn system, produced in multiple iterations by various manufacturers, including Duewag and Stadler, since 1985.

== Technical specifications ==
The trains are formed as two-car sets, with steel car bodies. Up to three sets can operate in multiple.

== Variants ==
=== First generation: DT8.4 & DT8.S ===
Testing of three prototype trains began in 1982 on the Alb Valley Railway.

Additional batches of Duewag-built DT8 cars were delivered in 1998, 1989–1990, 1992, 1993, and 1996; these were initially designated DT8.5, DT8.6, DT8.7, DT8.8, and DT8.9, respectively. These variants were all largely identical, aside from the removal of retractable steps from the DT8.6 onward.

From 2007 to 2017, the DT8.5, DT8.6, DT8.7, DT8.8, and DT8.9 cars were thoroughly refurbished by Bombardier. The motors on each were replaced with AC motors, and the interiors were redesigned to resemble those of the DT8.10 and DT8.11. Following the refurbishment, all five batches were renumbered (from 3087–3234 to 4087–4234), and officially redesignated as the DT8.S.

=== Second generation: DT8.10 & DT8.11 ===
The second generation of the DT8, dubbed the DT8.10, was built jointly by ADtranz and Siemens. 24 units were ordered, with deliveries beginning in April 1999. Visually, they are largely identical to their predecessors, inside and out, though they include a number of improvements, such as the addition of IGBT inverters and AC motors, open gangways, LCD information displays, and air conditioning.

Later, an additional 27 units, designated DT8.11, were ordered from Bombardier. Delivered from 2004 to 2005, they are almost completely identical to the prior DT8.10s.

=== Third generation: DT8.12 – DT8.15 ===
Built by Stadler Rail, the third-generation DT8 is based on the company's Tango model. Its exterior design differs greatly from prior DT8 variants, with a streamlined, aerodynamic front fascia, though its interior is similar to that of its predecessors.

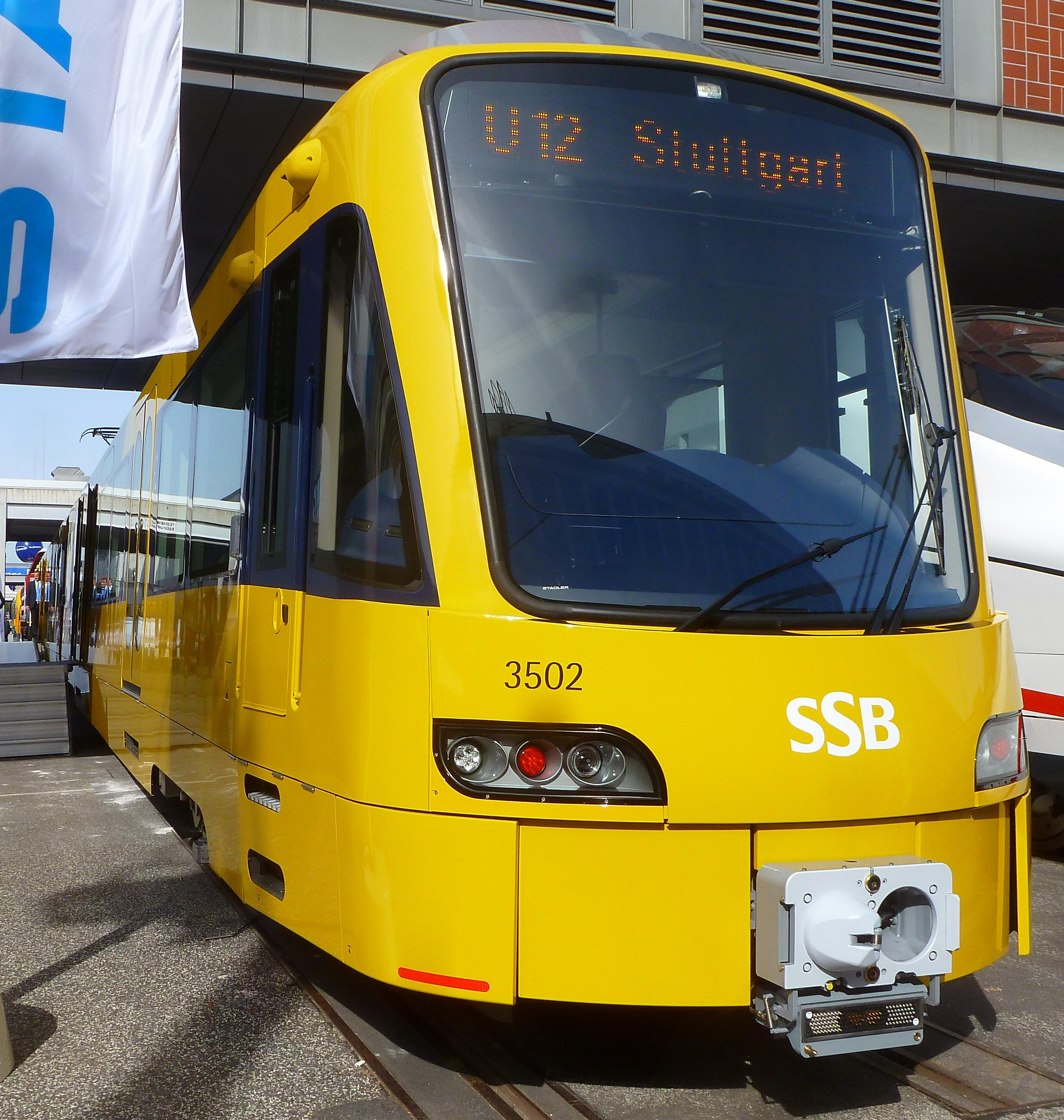
DT8.12 exhibited at InnoTrans 2012

Like the second-generation units, the third-generation DT8 has AC motors, air conditioning, and open gangways between cars. They are equipped with sliding plug doors, a departure from the swinging doors of earlier variants.

The first twenty, designated DT8.12, were ordered in 2010. 20 additional sets (DT8.14) were ordered in 2014, followed by twenty more (DT8.15) in 2017. 30 units, tentatively called DT8.16, are currently on order for delivery beginning in 2025; they are intended to replace the remaining original DT8.4 units.

== Preserved examples ==
Two prototype cars were formerly stored at Heslach depot, and were to be moved to the Straßenbahnwelt Bad Cannstatt in 2018.

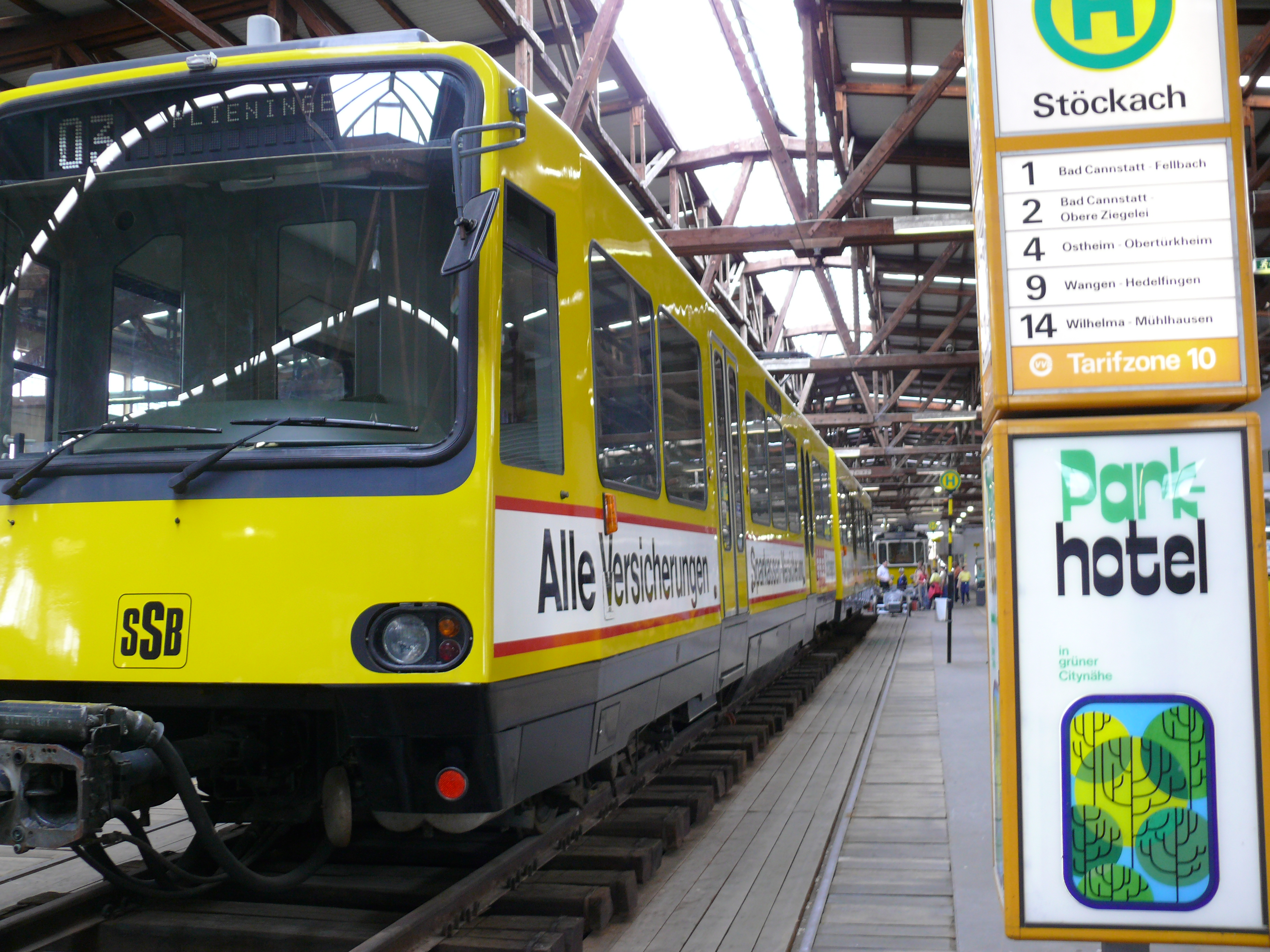
Cars 3001 and 3006 at the Straßenbahnmuseum Zuffenhausen in July 2007
