= 29th National Geographic Bee =

2017 American academic competition

- Date: May 15–17, 2017
- Location: Washington, D.C.
- Winner: Pranay Varada (14 at time of win)
- No. of contestants: 54

The 29th annual National Geographic Bee was held in Washington, D.C. It was sponsored by the National Geographic Society. The State Bees were held on March 31, 2017, where the 54 finalists were determined. The 2017 Champion, Pranay Varada, received a $50,000 college scholarship, a lifetime membership to the National Geographic Society, and an all-expenses-paid Lindblad expedition for two to the Galápagos Islands aboard the new National Geographic Endeavour ll.

== 2017 State Champions ==
On March 31, 2017, the National Geographic State Bees were held across the 50 states, Washington, D.C., the Atlantic Territories, the Pacific Territories, and the Department of Defense. Fifty-four State or Territory level Champions were determined.

State	Name	School	City/Town	Grade	Place
Alabama	Jason DiRusso	Louis Pizitz Middle School	Vestavia Hills	8th	
Alaska	Andres Arias	Nicholas J Begich Middle School	Anchorage	8th	
Arizona	Aditya Narayanan	Sonoran Sky Elementary School	Scottsdale	5th	
Arkansas	Denis Carranza	Elmwood Middle School	Rogers	7th	
(Puerto Rico) (United States Virgin Islands) Atlantic Territories	Matthew Haughton	Antilles School	St. Thomas, VI	8th	
California	Ahilan Eraniyan	Diablo Vista Middle School	Danville	6th	T-7th
Colorado	Henry Halgren	Liberty Common High School	Fort Collins	6th	
Connecticut	William Foster	Independent Day School	Middlefield	8th	
Delaware	Rohan Kanchana	Newark Charter School	Newark	8th	T-7th
Department of Defense	Connor Buchheit	Wiesbaden Middle School	Wiesbaden, Germany	8th	
District of Columbia	Max Garon	Sidwell Friends Middle School	Washington	7th	T-7th
Florida	Jacob Silver	Cypress Lake Middle School	Ft. Myers	6th	
Georgia	Vishal Sareddy	Riverwatch Middle School	Suwanee	7th	
Hawaii	Logan Kakugawa	Hawaii Baptist Academy	Honolulu	8th	
Idaho	Nicholas Monahan	Payette Lakes Middle School	McCall	8th	4th
Illinois	Sahan Yalavarthi	Twin Groves Middle School	Buffalo Grove	7th	
Indiana	Dylan Schutte	Sunman-Dearborn Middle School	Brookville	8th	
Iowa	Grant Pedersen	Cardinal Middle School	Eldon	7th	
Kansas	Sathvik Kasarabada	California Trail Middle School	Olathe	7th	
Kentucky	Evan Winkler	Morton Middle School	Lexington	8th	
Louisiana	Issac Jabaley	Lusher Charter School	New Orleans	6th	
Maine	Joseph Luchsinger	Berwick Academy	South Berwick	7th	
Maryland	Nabhoneel Sil Upadhyay	Kingsview Middle School	Germantown	8th	
Massachusetts	Theodore Z. Batty	Jenkins Elementary School	Scituate	6th	
Michigan	Peter Deegan-Krause	Ferndale Middle School	Ferndale	6th	
Minnesota	Lucas Eggers	STAR Homeschool Academy	Minnetonka	8th	6th
Mississippi	Edmund Doerksen	Oxford Middle School	Oxford	8th	
Missouri	Rohan Rao	Gentry Middle School	Columbia	7th	
Montana	Ian Williams	Sussex School	Missoula	8th	
Nebraska	Brendan Pennington	Prairie Lane Elementary School	Omaha	8th	
Nevada	Maia Marshall	St Elizabeth Ann Seton Catholic School	Las Vegas	8th	
New Hampshire	Abhinav Govindaraju	Ross A. Lurgio Middle School	Bedford	7th	10th
New Jersey	Veda Bhattaram	Robert R. Lazar Middle School	Montville	7th	3rd
New Mexico	Lakshay Sood	Albuquerque Academy	Albuquerque	6th	
New York	Tayler Anderson	Nyack Middle School	Nyack	7th	
North Carolina	Max Dyer	Phoenix Academy	High Point	6th	
North Dakota	Krishna Kamalakannan	Discovery Middle School	Fargo	7th	
Ohio	Saket Pochiraju	Orange Middle School	Lewis Center	7th	
Oklahoma	Antonino Libarnes	Oak Hill Episcopal School	Ardmore	5th	
Oregon	Ashwin Sivakumar	Oregon Episcopal School	Portland	7th	
(American Samoa) (Guam) (Northern Mariana Islands) Pacific Territories	Joanah Jimenez	Marianas Baptist Academy	Saipan, MP	7th	
Pennsylvania	Eshan Singh	Charles H Boehm Middle School	Yardley	7th	
Rhode Island	Isaiah Suchman	Nathan Bishop Middle School	Providence	8th	
South Carolina	Connor Fraley	Williams Middle School	Florence	8th	
South Dakota	Owen Fink	Bridgewater-Emery School	Bridgewater	6th	
Tennessee	Simeon Betapudi	Evangelical Christian School	Cordova	7th	
Texas	Pranay Varada	DeWitt Perry Middle School	Carrollton	8th	Champion
Utah	Ankit Garg	Bear River Charter School	Logan	7th	
Vermont	Anshuta Beeram	Frederick H Tuttle Middle School	South Burlington	6th	
Virginia	Anish Susarla	Belmont Ridge Middle School	Leesburg	6th	5th
Washington	Arjun Nathan	Pine Lake Middle School	Sammamish	8th	
West Virginia	Hunter Midcap	St. Michael Parish School	Wheeling	8th	
Wisconsin	Thomas Wright	University School of Milwaukee	Milwaukee	8th	2nd
Wyoming	Preston Buehler	Star Valley Middle School	Afton	7th	

== Preliminary rounds ==
The Preliminary Competition was held on Monday, May 15, 2017. It consisted of two parts: a written part and an oral part worth 16 points total. In the written part, contestants were asked to write a sentence about why preserving oceans is important, identify places on a map that had been part of National Geographic's "pristine seas" project, and write an paragraph about which place needed to have steps taken for its preservation first: The Rio de la Plata estuary, the Sundarbans, or the Great Barrier Reef. It was graded out of six points total. The oral part consisted of ten rounds about world geography and National Geographic Explorers. All 54 State Champions participated, and after a tiebreaker ten finalists were determined:

- Ahilan Eraniyan – from California
- Rohan Kanchana – from Delaware
- Max Garon – from District of Columbia
- Nicholas Monahan – from Idaho
- Lucas Eggers – from Minnesota
- Abhinav Govindaraju – from New Hampshire
- Veda Bhattaram – from New Jersey
- Pranay Varada – from Texas
- Anish Susarla – from Virginia
- Thomas Wright – from Wisconsin

== Final rounds ==
The Final Competition was held on Wednesday, May 17, 2017. The top 10 Finalists out of the 54 State Champions participated. Humorist, journalist, and actor Mo Rocca moderated the Competition for the second year in a row. The Champion was Pranay Varada of Texas. Thomas Wright of Wisconsin came second, and Veda Bhattaram of New Jersey came third. The GeoChallenge for the top three was about a new home country for the Maldivian people if their country becomes flooded after sea level rises. The choices were Indonesia, Turkey, and the Solomon Islands, in order of best to worst answer. In fourth place was Nicholas Monahan from Idaho. The fifth place finisher was Anish Susarla of Virginia, and Lucas Eggers of Minnesota came in sixth. Tying for seventh place were Rohan Kanchana of Delaware, Ahilan Eraniyan of California, and Max Garon of D.C. They were tied with Lucas Eggers, but in the tiebreaker question, asking for the distance between Washington, D.C., and London, they were eliminated after Eggers guessed closer to the correct answer than them and he moved on. In tenth place was Abhinav Govindaraju of New Hampshire. The first eliminations took place after round 5, a lightning round, where four left the competition. The next three eliminations were after round 9, another lightning round.
