= 10th National Geographic Bee =

1998 American academic competition

- Date: May 20, 1998
- Location: Washington, D.C.
- Winner: Petko Peev (13 at time of win)
- No. of contestants: 57

The 10th National Geographic Bee was held in Washington, D.C., on May 20, 1998, sponsored by the National Geographic Society. The final competition was moderated by Jeopardy! host Alex Trebek. The winner was Petko Peev of Forest Hills Central Middle School in Grand Rapids, Michigan, who won a $25,000 college scholarship. The 2nd-place winner, J. B. Kizer of Portsmouth, Ohio, won a $15,000 scholarship. The 3rd-place winner, Evan Sparks of Westminster Academy in Memphis, Tennessee, won a $10,000 scholarship.

== 1998 State Champions ==
State	Winner's Name	Grade	School	City/Town	Notes	
Alabama	David Hill	Indian Springs				
Alaska	Michael Hart	Soldotna				
American Samoa	Fa’atiga Ta’afua	Nua, Pago Pago				
Arizona	Aaron Linderman	McKemy Middle School	Tempe	Won the Arizona State Bee in 1997		
Arkansas	Benjamin Hardy	Ozark				
California	Austin Taylor	8th	Redwood Valley	Top 10 finalist		
Connecticut	Tim Courchaine	8th	John F. Kennedy Middle School	Enfield	Top 10 finalist	Won the Connecticut State Bee in 1997
Delaware	John Fry	Wilmington				
Florida	Candace Biggs	Lauderdale Lakes				
Georgia	Amy Collette	Commerce				
Guam	Jason Espiritu	Tamuning				
Hawaii	Matthew Ishida	7th	Honolulu	Top 10 finalist		
Idaho	Victor McFarland	Coeur d’Alene				
Illinois	Adam Janzen	Glasford				
Indiana	Kellie Packwood	Martinsville				
Louisiana	Benjamin Jones	8th	Monroe	Top 10 finalist		
Michigan	Petko Peev	8th	Forest Hills Central Middle School	Grand Rapids	1998 Champion	
Minnesota	David Hilde	Osakis				
Missouri	Eapen Thampy	8th	Creve Coeur	Top 10 finalist	Won the Missouri State Bee in 1997	
Montana	Peter Yager	Joliet				
Nebraska	Mark Sorensen	7th	Omaha	Top 10 finalist		
New Hampshire	Matthew Lawrence	Plaistow				
New Jersey	David Cohen	8th	Cranbury	Top 10 finalist		
New Mexico	Gulliver Hughes	Los Ranchos	Won the New Mexico State Bee in 1997			
New York	Mikhail Tenenbaum	Brooklyn				
North Carolina	Stanton Kidd	Cullowhee				
North Dakota	Patrick Hope	Dickinson				
Ohio	John B. Kizer, Jr.	8th	Portsmouth	Second Place		
Pennsylvania	Raji Shankar	Havertown				
South Carolina	David Beihl	7th	Saluda			
South Dakota	James Livingston	Watertown				
Tennessee	Evan Sparks	8th	Westminster Academy	Memphis	Third Place	
Texas	John Sharpless	Dallas				
Utah	Joshua Treybig	Sandy				
Virginia	Timothy Carr	Luray				
West Virginia	Benjamin Graber	Ronceverte				
Wisconsin	Ryan Masse	DeForest				
Wyoming	Jonathan Abresch	Worland				
