= 26th National Geographic Bee =

2014 American academic competition

- Date: May 19–21, 2014
- Location: Washington, D.C.
- Winner: Akhil Rekulapelli (13 at time of win)
- No. of contestants: 54

The 26th National Geographic Bee was held in Washington, D.C., on May 21, 2014, sponsored by the National Geographic Society. Soledad O'Brien hosted this event for the first time, replacing Alex Trebek.

Eighth-grader Akhil Rekulapelli, from Loudoun County, Virginia, won the competition, beating out 52 other competitors representing the 50 U.S. states, Pacific territories, and Department of Defense dependent schools.

In 2014, a record number of 9 perfect scores in the national preliminary competition was recorded. As a result, a sudden-death tiebreaker took place between 8 state representatives including contestants from Alabama, Utah, Texas, Maryland, Virginia, Illinois and Washington.

Akhil Rekulapelli, the 2014 National Geographic Bee Champion, received a $50,000 scholarship, a lifetime membership to the National Geographic Society, and a trip for 2 to the Galapagos Islands. Ameya Mujumdar, the second-place finisher received $25,000. Tuvya Bergson-Michelson, the third-place finisher received $10,000, and Pranit Nanda, the fourth-place finisher, received $1,000. Other top ten finishers received $500.

== 2014 state representatives ==
State	Name	School	City/Town	Grade	Place
Alabama	Christian Gonzalez	Huntsville Area Home Educators	Harvest	8th	
Alaska	J. Gray Harver	Kodiak Middle School	Kodiak	8th	
Arizona	Ari Mehta	Desert Cove E.S.	Phoenix	6th	
Arkansas	Christian Boekhout	Hot Springs Intermediate School	Hot Springs	8th	
(Puerto Rico) (United States Virgin Islands) Atlantic Territories	Jael King	Alfredo Andrews School	St. Croix	6th	
California	Tuvya Bergson-Michelson	The Nueva School	San Carlos	7th	3rd Place
Colorado	Pranit Nanda	Aurora Quest K-8	Aurora	8th	4th Place
Connecticut	Jimena Phipps	Middlesex Middle School	Darien	6th	
Delaware	Sohan Shah	The Independence School	Newark	8th	
Department of Defense	Patrick Lewallen	Ryukyu Middle School	Japan	8th	
District of Columbia	Quentin Powers	St. Anselm's Abbey School	District of Columbia	8th	
Florida	Ameya Mujumdar	Turner Elementary School	Tampa	5th	2nd Place
Georgia	Ansel Ahabue	Trickum Middle School	Lilburn	8th	8th Place (tie)
Hawaii	Mika Ishii	Kaimuki Middle School	Honolulu	6th	
Idaho	Amrit Singh	Grangeville Elementary/Middle School	Grangeville	8th	
Illinois	Mantra Dave	Chiddix Jr. High School	Normal	6th	
Indiana	Sean Ives	Trinity Lutheran School	Crown Point	8th	
Iowa	Shirlin Kingston	Ames Homeschool Assistance Program	Ames	5th	
Kansas	Chinmay Patil	California Trail Middle School	Olathe	6th	
Kentucky	Nikhil Krishna	Corbin Middle School	Corbin	8th	
Louisiana	Benjamin Link	St. Andrew's Episcopal School	New Orleans	8th	
Maine	Vincent Falardeau	Saco Middle School	Saco	8th	
Maryland	Abhinav Karthikeyan	Clearspring Elementary School	Damascus	5th	
Massachusetts	Nicholas Rommel	Diamond Middle School	Lexington	7th	8th Place (tie)
Michigan	Philip Huang	Washtenaw County Home Educators	Ann Arbor	8th	
Minnesota	Lucas Eggers	Hennepin County Homeschool	Eden Prairie	6th	
Mississippi	Victoria Gong	St. Aloysius	Vicksburg	7th	
Missouri	Evan Hensel	Wentzville Middle School	Wentzville	8th	
Montana	Jesse Zhang	Target Range School	Missoula	8th	
Nebraska	Brendan Pennington	Prairie Lane Elementary School	Omaha	5th	
Nevada	Benjamin Hand	Hyde Park Middle School	Las Vegas	8th	
New Hampshire	Kevin Owens	Ross A. Lurgio Middle School	Bedford	7th	
New Jersey	Charles Mills	Trinity Christian School	Montville	7th	
New Mexico	Gabriel Cuneo	Shepherd Lutheran	Albuquerque	8th	
New York	Gabriel Straus	Collegiate School for Boys	Manhattan	8th	
North Carolina	Sravya Kuchibhotla	Davis Drive Middle School	Cary	7th	
North Dakota	Erik Johnson	Bismarck Mandan Home Educators	Bismarck	8th	
Ohio	Kyle Yu	Lee Burneson Middle School	Westlake	8th	6th Place
Oklahoma	Aniket Dehardrai	Whittier Middle School	Norman	8th	
Oregon	Tor Parsons	Roosevelt Middle School	Eugene	7th	
(American Samoa) (Guam) (Northern Mariana Islands) Pacific Territories	Alex Eagan	Pacific Horizons School	Pago Pago	6th	
Pennsylvania	Ramya Muthukrishnan	E.N. Pierce Middle School	West Chester	8th	
Rhode Island	Maxwell Levine	Wheeler School	Providence	8th	8th Place (tie)
South Carolina	Krish Patel	Pinewood Preparatory School	Summerville	8th	5th Place
South Dakota	Bridger Gordon	Sturgis Williams Middle School	Sturgis	8th	
Tennessee	Christopher Damon	Meigs Middle Magnet School	Nashville	8th	
Texas	Benjamin Benjadol	Central Junior High School	Euless	7th	
Utah	Gauri Garg	Bear River Charter School	Logan	7th	
Vermont	Nicholas Norton	Essex Middle School	Essex Junction	8th	
Virginia	Akhil Rekulapelli	Stone Hill Middle School	Ashburn	8th	2014 National Champion
Washington	Andrew Ma	The Evergreen School	Shoreline	8th	
West Virginia	Andrew Christy	St. Francis Central Catholic School	Morgantown	8th	
Wisconsin	Asha Jain	MHLT Elementary School	Minocqua	8th	7th Place
Wyoming	Degory Day	Aspen Elementary School	Evanston	5th	
