= 24th National Geographic Bee =

2012 American academic competition

- Date: May 24, 2012
- Location: Washington, D.C.
- Winner: Rahul Nagvekar (14 at time of win)
- No. of contestants: 54

The 24th National Geographic Bee was held in Washington, D.C., on May 24, 2012, sponsored by the National Geographic Society.

Fourteen-year-old Rahul Nagvekar, from Sugar Land, Texas, won the competition, beating out 52 other competitors representing the 50 U.S. states, Pacific territories, and Department of Defense dependent schools.

== 2012 state representatives ==
State	Winner's Name	School	City/Town	Grade	Notes
Alabama	Daniel Picard	Berry Middle School	Hoover	7th	
Alaska	Andrew Hull	Rogers Park Elementary School	Anchorage	6th	Was a Top 10 Finalist in 2011
Arizona	Raghav Ranga	St. Gregory College Preparatory School	Tucson	8th	4th Place
Arkansas	Christian Boekhout	Hot Springs Intermediate School	Hot Springs	6th	
(Puerto Rico) (United States Virgin Islands) Atlantic Territories	Gilberto Marxuach	Academia del Perpetuo Socorro	San Juan	8th	
California	Varun Mahadevan	Prince of Peace Lutheran School	Fremont	7th	3rd Place
Colorado	Pranit Nanda	Aurora Quest K-8	Aurora	6th	
Connecticut	Michael Borecki	Middlesex Middle School	Darien	7th	
Delaware	Tomasz Moz	North Star Elementary School	Hockesin	5th	
Department of Defense	Dominik Muellerleile	Wiesbaden Middle School	Wiesbaden	8th	
District of Columbia	Matthew Wilson	Blessed Sacrament School	Washington, DC	7th	
Florida	Maya Patel	Liberty Middle School	Tampa	8th	
Georgia	Sahr Singh	Dodgen Middle School	Marietta	7th	First Girl to win Georgia State Competition
Hawaii	Mika Ishii	John Wilson Elementary School	Honolulu	4th	Youngest girl to ever compete in the National Geographic Bee
Idaho	Matthew Miller	Russell Elementary School	Moscow	5th	
Illinois	Conrad Oberhaus	Daniel Wright Junior High School	Lincolnshire	6th	
Indiana	Caroline Peterson	Homeschooled	South Bend	8th	First Girl to win Indiana State Competition
Iowa	John Mahoney	Stilwell Junior High	West Des Moines	7th	
Kansas	Ganesh Aruna	Overland Trail Middle School	Overland Park	8th	
Kentucky	Nikhil Krishna	Corbin Intermediate School	Corbin	6th	
Louisiana	James Anthony Stoner	Jesuit High School	New Orleans	8th	8th Place
Maine	Benjamin MacLean	York Middle School	York	8th	
Maryland	Adam Rusak	Lakelands Park Middle School	Gaithersburg	8th	10th Place
Massachusetts	Karthik Karnik	King Philip Regional Middle School	Norfolk	8th	Was a Top 10 Finalist in 2011; 6th Place
Michigan	Philip Huang	Wayne County Home Educators	Farmington Hills	6th	
Minnesota	Gopi Ramanathan	Sartell Middle School	Sartell	8th	7th Place
Mississippi	Josh Waldbieser	Margaret Green Junior High School	Cleveland	8th	
Missouri	Jack Langen	West Junior High School	Columbia	8th	
Montana	Rosie McCormack	St. Joseph Catholic School	Missoula	8th	
Nebraska	Jack Nussrallah	Mary Our Queen School	Omaha	6th	
Nevada	Nikolas Papameletiou	St. Anne Catholic School	Las Vegas	8th	
New Hampshire	Neelam Sandhu	Ross A. Lurgio Middle School	Bedford	7th	First New Hampshire Girl State Champion; 9th Place
New Jersey	Siddharth Kurella	Crossroads North Middle School	Monmouth Junction	8th	
New Mexico	Gabriel Cuneo	Shepherd Lutheran School	Albuquerque	6th	
New York	Aparna Nair-Kanneganti	Henry H. Wells Middle School	Brewster	8th	
North Carolina	William (Frank) Kenny	Charlotte Latin School	Charlotte	8th	
North Dakota	Tanner Carlson	Horizon Middle School	Bismarck	7th	
Ohio	Hayden Toftner	Olentangy Berkshire Middle School	Galena	6th	
Oklahoma	Ari Papahronis	Sequoyah Middle School	Edmond	7th	
Oregon	Pragyna Naik	Franklin K-8 School of Choice	Corvallis	6th	
(American Samoa) (Guam) (Northern Mariana Islands) Pacific Territories	Leonard Calvo	Bishop Baumgartner Memorial Catholic School	Guam	7th	
Pennsylvania	Arnav Jagasia	Radnor Middle School	Wayne	8th	
Rhode Island	Maxwell Levine	Wheeler School	Providence	6th	
South Carolina	Krish Patel	Pinewood Preparatory School	Summerville	6th	
South Dakota	Adam Wiegert	Patrick Henry Middle School	Sioux Falls	7th	
Tennessee	Alexander Wilaniskis	East Ridge Middle School	Whitesburg	7th	
Texas	Rahul Nagvekar- 1st	Quail Valley Middle School	Missouri City	8th	Champion
Utah	Anthony Cheng	Midvale Middle School	Midvale	8th	First Top 10 finalist 3 years in a row; 5th
Vermont	Christopher Gish	Sharon Academy	Sharon	8th	
Virginia	Kevin Zhan	George H. Moody Middle School	Richmond	8th	
Washington	Nicholas Helmer	Discovery Middle School	Vancouver	8th	
West Virginia	Andrew Christy	St. Francis Central Catholic School	Morgantown	6th	
Wisconsin	Vansh Jainfraghav	MHLT Elementary School	Minocqua	8th	2nd Place
Wyoming	August Prevedel	Rock Springs Junior High School	Rock Springs	8th	
