= 25th National Geographic Bee =

2013 American academic competition

- Date: May 22, 2013
- Location: Washington, D.C.
- Winner: Sathwik Karnik (12 at time of win)
- No. of contestants: 54

The 25th National Geographic Bee was held in Washington, D.C., on May 22, 2013, sponsored by the National Geographic Society. This was the final National Geographic Bee that Alex Trebek hosted--at the end of the event, Alex announced that Soledad O'Brien would be next year's moderator.

Twelve-year-old Sathwik Karnik, from Plainville, Massachusetts, won the competition, beating out 52 other competitors representing the 50 U.S. states, Pacific territories, and Department of Defense dependent schools.

== 2013 state representatives ==
State	Name	School	City/Town	Grade	Notes
Alabama	Christopher Lough	Prattville Christian Academy	Prattville	7th	
Alaska	Kenny Petrini	Central Middle School of Science	Anchorage	8th	
Arizona	Cameron Danesh	Mountainside Middle School	Scottsdale	6th	
Arkansas	Christian Boekhout	Hot Springs Intermediate School	Hot Springs	7th	
(Puerto Rico) (United States Virgin Islands) Atlantic Territories	Leonides Diaz Fuster	Saint John's School	San Juan	7th	
California	Tuvya Bergson-Michelson	Nueva School	San Ramon	6th	7th place
Colorado	Pranit Nanda	Aurora Quest K-8	Aurora	7th	10th place
Connecticut	Michael Borecki	Middlesex Middle School	Darien	8th	
Delaware	Kevin Orzada	The Independence School	Newark	8th	
Department of Defense	Patrick Lewallen	Ryukyu Middle School	Japan	7th	
District of Columbia	Lars Nordquist	St. Albans School	District of Columbia	5th	
Florida	Walker Miller	Weldon Johnson Middle School	Jacksonville	8th	
Georgia	Sanjeev "Ricky" Uppaluri	Fulton Sunshine Elementary	Alpharetta	5th	3rd place
Hawaii	Andrew Anderton	Island School	Lihue	8th	
Idaho	Amrit Singh	Grangeville Elementary/Middle School	Grangeville	7th	
Illinois	Conrad Oberhaus	Daniel Wright Junior High School	Lincolnshire	7th	2nd place
Indiana	Sean Ives	Trinity Lutheran School	Crown Point	7th	
Iowa	Jonathan Grunenwald	Ames Homeschool Assistance Program	Ames	8th	
Kansas	Preneeta Nalluri	Overland Trail Middle School	Overland Park	6th	
Kentucky	Hunter Watkins	Calloway, Marshall, & McCracken Cty Homeschoolers	Farmington	8th	
Louisiana	Cècile Girard	Bishop Noland Episcopal Day School	Lake Charles	7th	
Maine	Archer Thomas	Bonny Eagle Middle School	Buxton	8th	
Maryland	Abhinav Karthikeyan	Clearspring Elementary School	Damascus	4th	
Massachusetts	Sathwik Karnik	King Philip Regional Middle School	Plainville	7th	1st place
Michigan	Neha Middela	Detroit Country Day School	Detroit	6th	9th place
Minnesota	Alexander Conrad	Valley View Middle School	Edina	7th	
Mississippi	Jun Chen	Margaret Green Junior High School	Cleveland	8th	
Missouri	Aviral Misra	Academy Montessori Internationale	Kansas City	5th	
Montana	Grace Rembert	Morning Star Elementary	Bozeman	5th	
Nebraska	Theodore Jansen	Paddock Road Elementary	Omaha	5th	
Nevada	Nick Vazeen	Challenger School – Summerlin Campus	Las Vegas	8th	
New Hampshire	Neelam Sandhu	Ross A. Lurgio Middle School	Bedford	8th	7th place; went on to St. Petersburg, Russia for the International Competition Asha Jain (also a finalist this year) and Gopi Ramanathan of Minnesota from 2012
New Jersey	William DiGrande	Warren Middle School	Warren	8th	
New Mexico	Huy Tran	Albuquerque Academy	Albuquerque	7th	
New York	Gabriel Straus	Collegiate School for Boys	Manhattan	7th	
North Carolina	Matthew Janson	Randolph Middle School	Charlotte	8th	
North Dakota	Luke Bowan	Jamestown Area Homeschoolers	Jamestown	8th	
Ohio	Kyle Yu	Lee Burneson Middle School	Westlake	7th	
Oklahoma	Matthew Armor	Whittier Middle School	Norman	8th	
Oregon	Harish Palani	Stoller Middle School	Portland	7th	5th place
(American Samoa) (Guam) (Northern Mariana Islands) Pacific Territories	Jacob Augelli	Cmd. William C. McCool Elem/Middle	Guam	7th	
Pennsylvania	Sai Mahit Vaddadi	Eagle View Middle School	Mechanicsburg	8th	
Rhode Island	Jacob Polatty	Rhode Island Home Educators	North Kingstown	7th	
South Carolina	Krish Patel	Pinewood Preparatory School	Summerville	7th	
South Dakota	Mark Vanderzee	George S. Mickelson Middle School	Brookings	7th	
Tennessee	Alexander Wilaniskis	East Ridge Middle School	Whitesburg	7th	
Texas	Chinmay Murthy	Paragon Preparatory School	Austin	5th	
Utah	Joshua Nkoy	Challenger School	Sandy	8th	
Vermont	Tyler Jager	Manchester Elementary/Middle School	Manchester Center	7th	
Virginia	Akhil Rekulapelli	Stone Hill Middle School	Ashburn	7th	4th Place
Washington	Owen Benda	Open Window School	Bellevue	7th	
West Virginia	Andrew Christy	St. Francis Central Catholic School	Morgantown	7th	
Wisconsin	Asha Jain	MHLT Elementary School	Minocqua	7th	6th Place; went on to St. Petersburg, Russia for the International Competition with Neelam Sandhu (also a finalist this year) and Gopi Ramanathan of Minnesota from 2012
Wyoming	Garrett Means	Snowy Range Academy	Laramie	8th	
