= 1st National Geographic Bee =

1989 American academic competition

- Date: May 19, 1989
- Location: Washington, D.C.
- Winner: Jack Staddon (15 at time of win)
- No. of contestants: 57

The 1st National Geographic Bee was held in Washington, D.C., on May 19, 1989, sponsored by the National Geographic Society. The final competition was moderated by Jeopardy! host Alex Trebek. The winner was Jack Staddon of Great Bend Seventh-day Adventist Elementary School in Great Bend, Kansas, who won a $25,000 college scholarship. The 2nd-place winner, Michael Shannon of Reading, Massachusetts, won a $15,000 scholarship. The 3rd-place winner, Kieu Luu of Riverdale, Maryland, won a $10,000 scholarship.

== 1989 State Champions ==
State	Winner's Name	Grade	School	City/Town	Notes
Alabama	Matthew Joseph	Mountain Gap Middle School	Huntsville	Top 10 finalist	
Arkansas	Michael Sundell	Top 10 finalist			
Indiana	Ralph Feldhake	8th	Indianapolis	Top 10 finalist	
Kansas	Jack Staddon	8th	Great Bend	1989 Champion	
Maryland	Kieu Luu	Riverdale	Third Place		
Massachusetts	Michael Shannon	Reading	Second Place		
New York	Christopher Dziedzic	Top 10 finalist			
Oregon	Benjamin Foley	Top 10 finalist			
Utah	Ian King	Churchill Junior High	Millcreek	Top 10 finalist	
Washington	Christopher Hayward	Spokane	Top 10 finalist		
