= 19th National Geographic Bee =

2007 American academic competition

- Date: May 23, 2007
- Location: Washington, D.C.
- Winner: Caitlin Snaring (14 at time of win)
- No. of contestants: 55

The 19th National Geographic Bee was held in Washington, D.C., on May 23, 2007, sponsored by the National Geographic Society.

== State champions ==
- Alabama – Matthew Riggle, 7th Grade, St. John the Baptist Catholic School, Madison
- Alaska – Andrew Lee, 8th Grade, Interior Distance Education of Alaska, Anchorage
- Arizona – Nathan Tappendorf, 6th Grade, Eastside Explorers Homeschool, Phoenix
- Arkansas – Jason Saunders, 8th Grade, Home Educators of Greater Little Rock, Little Rock
- California – Mitchell Mankin, 8th Grade, Brandeis Hillel Day School, San Francisco
- Colorado – José de la Peña, 8th Grade, CHEC, Colorado Springs
- Connecticut – Gregory Naigles, 8th Grade, Tolland Middle School, Tolland
- Delaware – Daniel Barnes, 8th Grade, Springer Middle School, Wilmington
- Department of Defense – Andrew Hartford, 8th Grade, Lakenheath Middle, East Anglia, United Kingdom
- District of Columbia – Benjamin Geyer, 7th Grade, British School of Washington
- Florida – Michael Aquilia, 8th Grade, Farnell Middle School, Tampa
- Georgia – Kaj Hansen, 8th Grade, Carrollton Junior High, Carrollton, Georgia
- Hawaii – Isolde Callihan, 8th Grade, Hawaii Island Christian Home Educators, Hilo
- Idaho – Brandon Smith, 6th Grade, Ellis Elementary, Chubbuck
- Illinois – Zachary Blumenfeld, 8th Grade, Daniel Wright Junior High, Lincolnshire
- Indiana – Erik Troske, 7th Grade, Barker Middle, Michigan
- Iowa – Derek Hofland, 8th Grade, Sanborn Christian School, Sanborn
- Kansas – Suneil Iyer, 7th Grade, Indian Trail Junior High, Olathe
- Kentucky – Solomon Mayer, 8th Grade, Sayre School, Lexington
- Louisiana – Amal de Alwis, 5th Grade, SLU Laboratory School, Hammond
- Maine – John Walsh, 8th Grade, Harrison Middle, Yarmouth
- Maryland – Raynell Cooper, 8th Grade, Julius West Middle School, Maryland
- Massachusetts – Christopher Hart, 8th Grade, Westfield South Middle, Westfield
- Michigan – Daniel Elkus, 8th Grade, Cranbrook Kingswood Boys Middle, Bloomfield Hills
- Minnesota – Andrew Ford, 8th Grade, St. Louis Park Junior High St. Louis Park
- Mississippi – Devi Swamy, 8th Grade, Madison Middle, Madison
- Missouri – Hannah Goodman, 8th Grade, S.H.A.R.E. Homeschool, St. Louis
- Montana – Shawn Belobraidic, 8th Grade, Bonner School, Bonner
- Nebraska – Andrew Vinton, 7th Grade, St. Patrick School, North Platte
- Nevada – William Niday, 8th Grade, Carson Valley Middle, Gardnerville
- New Hampshire – Milan Sandhu, 7th Grade, McKelvie Middle, Bedford
- New Jersey – Rachel McEnroe, 8th Grade, Oak Hill Academy, Lincroft
- New Mexico – Sam Waitt, 6th Grade, Rio Grande School, Santa Fe
- New York – Josh Shih, 8th Grade, C.J. Hooker Middle, Goshen
- North Carolina – Tahsin Zaman, 8th Grade, Daniels Middle, Raleigh
- North Dakota – James Penrod, 8th Grade, Memorial Middle, Minot
- Ohio – Jon Moller, 8th Grade, Walnut Hills High School, Cincinnati
- Oklahoma – Tyler Bowen, 8th Grade, Lakeview Middle, Yukon
- Oregon – Michael Ling, 7th Grade, Meadow Park Middle, Beaverton
- Pacific Territories – Samuel Wolborsky, 8th Grade, Andersen Middle, Guam
- Pennsylvania – Andrew Nadig, 8th Grade, Manheim Township Middle, Lancaster
- Puerto Rico – Francisco Vargas, 8th Grade, St. John's School, San Juan
- Rhode Island – Samuel Curry, 7th Grade, Broad Rock Middle, Wakefield
- South Carolina – Trey Dendrinos, 8th Grade, Forest Acres Christian Educators, West Columbia
- South Dakota – Alex Larson, 8th Grade, Vermillion Middle, Vermillion
- Tennessee – Mark Arildsen, 7th Grade, University School of Nashville, Nashville
- Texas – Jiawei Li, 8th Grade, Beck Junior High, Katy
- Utah – Kennen Sparks, 6th Grade, Windridge Elementary, Kaysville
- Vermont – Taylor Horn, 8th Grade, Leland and Gray Union Middle School, Townshend
- Virginia – Partha Narasimhan, 6th Grade, Mercer Middle, Aldie
- Virgin Islands – Muta Abiff, 7th Grade, Addelita Cancryn Junior High, St. Thomas
- Washington – Caitlin Snaring, 8th Grade, Family Learning Center, Redmond
- West Virginia – Benjamin Taylor, 5th Grade, Monongalia Homeschoolers Association, Morgantown
- Wisconsin – Bjorn Ager-Hart, 8th Grade, FISH Home Education Network, Madison
- Wyoming – Kirsi Anselmi Stith, 5th Grade, Holy Spirit School, Rock Springs

== Overview ==
The final competition was moderated by Jeopardy! host Alex Trebek. The winner was Caitlin Snaring, a homeschooled student from Redmond, Washington, who won a $25,000 college scholarship and lifetime membership in the National Geographic Society. The 2nd-place winner, Suneil Iyer of Kansas, won a $15,000 scholarship. The 3rd-place winner, Mark Arildsen of Tennessee, won a $10,000 scholarship.
