= 9th National Geographic Bee =

1997 American academic competition

- Date: May 28, 1997
- Location: Washington, D.C.
- Winner: Alex Kerchner (12 at time of win)
- No. of contestants: 57

The 9th National Geographic Bee was held in Washington, D.C., on May 28, 1997, sponsored by the National Geographic Society. The final competition was moderated by Jeopardy! host Alex Trebek. The winner was Alex Kerchner of Kamiakin Junior High School in Kirkland, Washington, who won a $25,000 college scholarship. The 2nd-place winner, Steve Sreckovic of South Milwaukee, Wisconsin, won a $15,000 scholarship. The 3rd-place winner, Justin Mosel of Orchard, Nebraska, won a $10,000 scholarship.

== 1997 State Champions ==
State	Winner's Name	Grade	School	City/Town	Notes	
Alabama	Ryan Confer	Randolph Middle School	Huntsville			
Alaska	Michael Hart	Soldotna Middle School	Soldotna			
American Samoa	Leonard Hyman	South Pacific Academy	Pago Pago			
Arizona	Aaron Linderman	McKemy Middle School	Tempe	Top 10 finalist		
Arkansas	Jonathan VerHoeven	schooled at home	Springdale			
California	Gavin Skram	Teel Middle School	Empire			
Colorado	Jeff Russell	Powell Middle School	Littleton			
Connecticut	Tim Courchaine	John F. Kennedy Middle School	Enfield	Top 10 finalist		
Hawaii	Darlene Dela Cruz	Kalakaua Intermediate School	Honolulu			
Idaho	Victor McFarland	Lakes Middle School	Coeur d'Alene			
Indiana	Robby Schrum	Taft Junior High School	Crown Point			
Iowa	Amy Nugteren	Pella Christian Grade School	Pella			
Kansas	Redha Elminyawi	Dwight D. Eisenhower Middle School	Manhattan	Top 10 finalist		
Kentucky	Louis Burnoski	Crosby Middle School	Louisville			
Louisiana	Keith Maddox	Riverdale Middle School	Jefferson			
Maine	Jason Moreau	Glenburn Middle School	Glenburn			
Maryland	Pablo Ruiz	Eastern Middle School	Silver Spring			
Massachusetts	Jamie Kettleson	Central Middle School	Quincy			
Michigan	Petko Peev	7th	Forest Hills Central Middle School	Grand Rapids	Top 10 finalist	Won the Michigan State Bee in 1996
Minnesota	Dan Weber	St. Therese School	Deephaven			
Missouri	Eapen Thampy	Maryland Heights	Top 10 finalist			
Montana	Phillip Bloom	Will James Middle School	Billings			
Nebraska	Justin Mosel	Orchard Public School	Orchard	Third Place		
Nevada	Chris Young	Greenspun Junior High School	Henderson			
New Hampshire	Morgan Brown	Walpole Elementary School	Walpole			
New Jersey	T.J. Brazda	Martin J. Ryerson School	Ringwood			
New Mexico	Gulliver Hughes	Albuquerque	Top 10 finalist			
New York	Deepak Kollali	8th	Mildred E. Strang Middle School	Yorktown Heights	Top 10 finalist	
North Carolina	Michael Mueller	Aycock Middle School	Greensboro			
North Dakota	Aaron Shreve	Mandan Junior High School	Mandan	Top 10 finalist		
Ohio	Matt Bowshier	Washington Middle School	Washington Courthouse			
Pennsylvania	Jonathan Squibb	Lamberton Middle School	Carlisle			
South Carolina	Jonathan Hess	Irmo Middle School	Columbia			
South Dakota	Megan Storm	Yankton Middle School	Yankton			
Texas	Vivek Kasinath	Keystone School	San Antonio			
Utah	Adam Stoddard	South David Junior High School	Bountiful			
Virginia	Dennis Bakke	Arlington				
Washington	Alex Kerchner	7th	Kamiakin Junior High School	Kirkland	1997 Champion	
West Virginia	Daniel Harris	St. Agnes Middle School	Charleston			
Wisconsin	Steve Sreckovic	8th	South Milwaukee Middle School	South Milwaukee	Second Place	
Wyoming	Paul McVey	East Junior High School	Casper			
