= 23rd National Geographic Bee =

2011 American academic competition

- Date: May 25, 2011
- Location: Washington, D.C.
- Winner: Tiné Valencic (13 at time of win)
- No. of contestants: 54

The 23rd National Geographic Bee was held in Washington, D.C. on May 25, 2011, sponsored by the National Geographic Society.

7th grader Tiné Valencic, from Colleyville, Texas won the competition, beating out 52 other competitors representing the 50 U.S. states, Pacific territories, and Department of Defense dependent schools.

State	Winner's Name	School	City/Town	Grade	Notes
Alabama	Daniel Picard	Berry Middle School	Hoover	6th	
Alaska	Andrew Hull	Rogers Park Elementary	Anchorage	5th	Top 10 finalist (10th)
Arizona	Luke Hellum	Sunrise Middle School	Scottsdale	8th	Top 10 finalist (7th)
Arkansas	Christian Boekhout	Hot Spring Intermediate School	Hot Springs	5th	
(Puerto Rico) (United States Virgin Islands) Atlantic Territories	Jamon Fisk	St. Croix Country Day School	Kingshill, U.S. Virgin Islands	8th	
California	Tuvya Bergson-Michelson	The Nueva School	Hillsborough	4th	Top 10 finalist (T-8th)
Colorado	Isabella Contolini	Dunstan Middle School	Lakewood	7th	
Connecticut	Michael Borecki	Middlesex Middle School	Darien	6th	
Delaware	Sophia Marianiello	Newark Charter School	Newark	7th	
Department of Defense	Gavin Moulton	Naples American Middle School	Naples, Italy	7th	
District of Columbia	Nathaniel Burrows	Maret School	Washington, D.C.	6th	
Florida	Martin Konstantinov	Lake Mary Preparatory School	Lake Mary	6th	
Georgia	Nilai Sarda	The Westminster School	Atlanta	7th	2nd Place
Hawaii	Andrew Anderton	Hawaii Technology Academy	Waipahu	6th	
Idaho	Dylan Smith	Taylorview Junior High School	Idaho Falls	8th	
Illinois	Annie Ulrich	Lake County Homeschoolers	Grayslake	8th	
Indiana	Kevin Mi	Creekside Middle School	Carmel	8th	Top 10 finalist (T-8th)
Iowa	Ian Klopfenstein	Franklin Middle School	Cedar Rapids	7th	
Kansas	Stefan Petrović	South Junior High School	Lawrence	7th	Was a finalist in 2010; 3rd Place
Kentucky	Nivedita Khandkar	Meyzeek Middle School	Louisville	8th	
Louisiana	James Anthony Stoner	Christian Brothers School	New Orleans	7th	
Maine	Benjamin MacLean	York Middle School	York	7th	
Maryland	Neel Lakhanpal	Severn School	Severna Park	7th	
Massachusetts	Karthik Karnik	King Philip Middle School	Norfolk	7th	Top 10 finalist (T-5th)
Michigan	Jacob Tanner	Saline Middle School	Saline	8th	
Minnesota	William Bogenschultz	Ramsey Junior High School	St. Paul	7th	
Mississippi	Luke Eckstein	St. Aloysius High School	Vicksburg	8th	
Missouri	Joshua Vogel	Trinity Lutheran School	Cape Girardeau	8th	
Montana	Claire Hinther	Target Range School	Missoula	8th	
Nebraska	Sean Lynch	St. Wenceslaus School	Omaha	7th	
Nevada	Daniel Zhu	Schofield Middle School	Las Vegas	8th	
New Hampshire	Isaac Ozer	Windham Middle School	Windham	8th	
New Jersey	Kevin Pang	Stewartsville Middle School	Stewartsville	7th	
New Mexico	Zachary Ward	Albuquerque Area Home Educators	Albuquerque	8th	
New York	Matthew Wigler	Great Neck North Middle School	Great Neck	8th	
North Carolina	Alex Pinder	St. Leo the Great Parish School	Winston-Salem	6th	
North Dakota	Tanner Carlson	Grimsrud Elementary School	Bismarck	6th	
Ohio	Narayan Narasimhan	Shaker Heights Middle School	Shaker Heights	8th	
Oklahoma	Soorajnath Boominathan	Deer Creek Middle School	Edmond	8th	
Oregon	Harish Palani	Findley Elementary School	Portland	5th	
(American Samoa) (Guam) (Northern Mariana Islands) Pacific Territories	Caleb Skvaril	Bishop Baumgartner Memorial Catholic School	Guam	8th	
Pennsylvania	Alexander Kozitzky	Indian Crest Middle School	Souderton	8th	
Rhode Island	Chase Boni	North Cumberland Middle School	Cumberland	8th	
South Carolina	Krish Patel	Pinewood Preparatory School	Summerville	5th	
South Dakota	Alex Kimn	George S. Mickelson Middle School	Brookings	8th	Top 10 finalist (4th)
Tennessee	Arunabh Singh	Schilling Farms Middle School	Collierville	8th	
Texas	Tine Valencic	Colleyville Middle School	Colleyville	7th	2011 Champion
Utah	Anthony Cheng	Midvale Middle School	Midvale	7th	Was a finalist in 2010; Top 10 finalist (T-5th)
Virginia	Patrick Hammes	Herndon Middle School	Herndon	7th	
Vermont	Sparsh Bhardwaj	Fredrick H. Tuttle Middle School	South Burlington	7th	
Washington	Arjun Kumar	Beavar Lake Middle School	Issaquah	7th	
West Virginia	Abel Abraham	St. Francis de Sales Central Catholic School	Morgantown	8th	
Wisconsin	Robert Rosner	Phelps School	Phelps	8th	
Wyoming	Dwaine Kenney	Big Piney Middle School	Big Piney	8th	
