= 8th National Geographic Bee =

1996 American academic competition

- Date: May 29, 1996
- Location: Washington, D.C.
- Winner: Seyi Fayanju (12 at time of win)
- No. of contestants: 57

The 8th National Geographic Bee was held in Washington, D.C., on May 29, 1996, sponsored by the National Geographic Society. The final competition was moderated by Jeopardy! host Alex Trebek. The winner was Seyi Fayanju of Henry B. Whitehorne Middle School in Verona, New Jersey, who won a $25,000 college scholarship. The 2nd-place winner, Ryan Bean of Augusta, Maine, won a $15,000 scholarship. The 3rd-place winner, Matthew Conway of El Reno, Oklahoma, won a $10,000 scholarship.

== 1996 State Champions ==
State	Winner's Name	Grade	School	City/Town	Notes
Maine	Ryan Bean	8th	Buker Middle School	Augusta	Second Place
Michigan	Petko Peev	6th	Forest Hills Central Middle School	Grand Rapids	
New Jersey	Seyi Fayanju	7th	Henry B. Whitehorne Middle School	Verona	1996 Champion
Oklahoma	Matthew Conway	Etta Ball Junior High School	El Reno	Third Place	
Pennsylvania	John McElhenney	Greenville	Top 10 finalist		
Rhode Island	Paul Ring	Top 10 finalist			
Texas	Paul Benson	Sugar Land	Top 10 finalist		
Virginia	Nathaniel Carr	Luray	Top 10 finalist		
Washington	Alex Kerchner	6th	Kamiakin Junior High School	Kirkland	Top 10 finalist (4th place)
Wisconsin	Vishnu Bhakta	Top 10 finalist			
Wyoming	Patrick Smith	Top 10 finalist			
