= 4th National Geographic Bee =

1992 American academic competition

- Date: May 21, 1992
- Location: Washington, D.C.
- Winner: Lawson Fite (13 at time of win)
- No. of contestants: 57

The 4th National Geographic Bee was held in Washington, D.C., on May 21, 1992, sponsored by the National Geographic Society. The final competition was moderated by Jeopardy! host Alex Trebek. The winner was Lawson Fite of Shumway Middle School in Vancouver, Washington, who won a $25,000 college scholarship. The 2nd-place winner, Geoffrey Hatchard of Cresco, Pennsylvania, won a $15,000 scholarship. The 3rd-place winner, Michael Sherback of North Easton, Massachusetts, won a $10,000 scholarship.

== 1992 State Champions ==
State	Winner's Name	Grade	School	City/Town	Notes
American Samoa	Brooke Schone				
Idaho	Jetta Hatch	8th	Top 10 finalist		
Massachusetts	Michael Sherback	Easton Middle School	North Easton	Third Place	
Michigan	Noel Erinjeri	7th	Swartz Creek	Top 10 finalist (4th place)	
Minnesota	Elizabeth Beissel				
Missouri	Jason Crowder	Zion Lutheran School	St. Charles	Top 10 finalist	
Montana	Brian Hall	Top 10 finalist			
Nevada	Sarah Bils				
New York	Matt Graybosch	Top 10 finalist			
Oklahoma	Andrew McKenzie				
Ohio	Eileen Grench				
Pennsylvania	Geoffrey Hatchard	Cresco	Second Place		
Rhode Island	Sarah Loftus				
Utah	Robert Ricks	8th	Top 10 finalist		
Vermont	Matt Johnson	Top 10 finalist			
Washington	Lawson Fite	8th	Shumway Middle School	Vancouver	1992 Champion
