= 6th National Geographic Bee =

1994 American academic competition

- Date: May 25, 1994
- Location: Washington, D.C.
- Winner: Anders Knospe (14 at time of win)
- No. of contestants: 57

The 6th National Geographic Bee was held in Washington, D.C., on May 25, 1994, sponsored by the National Geographic Society. The final competition was moderated by Jeopardy! host Alex Trebek. The winner was Anders Knospe of Bozeman, Montana, who won a $25,000 college scholarship. The 2nd-place winner, Michael Bebow of Metairie, Louisiana, won a $15,000 scholarship. The 3rd-place winner, Jeorse Lund of Henderson, Nevada, won a $10,000 scholarship.

== 1994 State Champions ==
State	Winner's Name	Grade	School	City/Town	Notes
Arizona	Patrick Sullivan	Top 10 finalist (tie-9th place)			
California	Jory Hecht	Top 10 finalist			
Colorado	Jeffrey Fivehouse	Top 10 finalist (tie-9th place)			
Connecticut	Stephen Fan				
Delaware	Stephan J. (Steve) Strengari, Jr.				
District of Columbia	John Norad				
Florida	Jamie Jones				
Idaho	Anthony Georgia				
Illinois	Jasen Ho	8th	Whitney Young Academic Center	Chicago	
Louisiana	Michael Bebow	Metairie	Second Place		
Maryland	Matthew Coyle	Top 10 finalist (8th place)			
Michigan	Chris Galeczka	7th	Bemis Junior High School	Sterling Heights	Top 10 finalist
Missouri	Michael Hauser				
Montana	Anders Knospe	8th	Bozeman	1994 Champion	
Nevada	Jeorse Lund	Henderson	Third Place		
New Jersey	Seyi Fayanju	5th	Laning Avenue School	Verona	
Ohio	Robie Herrick	Top 10 finalist			
Oklahoma	Michael Baker	8th	St. James Catholic School		
Pennsylvania	Jeffrey Hoppes	Lancaster	Top 10 finalist		
South Dakota	John Platic				
Tennessee	Ned Andrews	7th	Knoxville		
Wyoming	Jeremiah Lindsey				
