= 31st National Geographic Bee =

2019 American academic competition

- Date: May 19–22, 2019
- Location: Washington, D.C.
- Winner: Nihar Janga (14 at time of win)
- No. of contestants: 54

The 31st annual National Geographic Bee was held in Washington, D.C., and hosted by Mo Rocca. It is sponsored by the National Geographic Society. The State Bees were held on March 29, where the 54 finalists were determined. The 2019 Champion, Nihar Janga, received a $25,000 college scholarship, a lifetime membership to the National Geographic Society, and an all-expenses-paid Lindblad Expedition for two to the Galápagos Islands. This was to be the last GeoBee, as National Geographic made the decision to end the competition, after canceling the 2020 and 2021 National Geographic Bees due to the COVID-19 pandemic.

== State Bees ==
On March 29, 2019, the National Geographic State Bees were held across the 50 states, Washington, D.C., the Atlantic Territories, the Pacific Territories, and the Department of Defense. Fifty-four State or Territory level Champions were determined. In 2019, the prize for winning the state bee has been raised, as $1,000 is now given to the winner instead of $200, the old prize. The winners have also received a National Geographic 2019 Almanac. Second and third place winners received $300 and $100, respectively. The state preliminary rounds (there were eight total) consisted of rounds about U.S. geography, physical geography, UNESCO World Heritage Sites, Weird but True, current events, Odd one out, US City-World City Comparison, and plastic. All 54 regional champions received an all-expenses-paid trip to Washington, D.C., to compete at the national competition from May 19–22.

State	Name	School	City/Town	Grade	Place	Notes
Alabama	Krish Nathan	Deer Valley Elementary School	Hoover	4th	43rd	Brother of Kapil Nathan, who placed 3rd in nation in 2016
Alaska	Alana Belle Tirado	Romig Middle School	Anchorage	8th	T-29th	Only female state champion
Arizona	Christian Luis Aquino	White Cliffs Middle School	Kingman	8th	T-37th	Important to note that the runner up was a 4th grader, Carter Thompson, from San Tan Learning Center in Gilbert
Arkansas	Ahilan Eraniyan	Haas Hall Academy	Bentonville	8th	16th	Won CA in 2017, placed 7th in the nation
(Puerto Rico) (United States Virgin Islands) Atlantic Territories	Diego Vázquez	Academia del Perpetuo Socorro	San Juan	7th	51st	
California	Jishnu Nayak	Peter Hansen Elementary School	Mountain House	6th	4th	
Colorado	Garrett Fleischmann	Stargate Middle School	Thornton	8th	T-22nd	Won the Colorado State Bee in 2018
Connecticut	Lukas Koutsoukos	Middlebrook Middle School	Wilton	8th	18th	Brother of Alexander Koutsoukos, who won the Connecticut State Bee in 2015
Delaware	Justin Didden (Ian Lewis representing)	Central Middle School	Dover	7th	T-49th	Ian Lewis was the second place winner of the Delaware State Geography Bee, but as Justin Didden was unable to attend, Ian Lewis instead represented Delaware at nationals
Department of Defense	Eddy Melendez	Lester Middle School	Kitanakagusuku, Japan	8th	52nd	
District of Columbia	Arjun Patel	St. Alban's School for Boys	Washington	5th	36th	
Florida	Kaylan Patel	Windermere Preparatory School	Windermere	7th	T-9th	Won the Florida State Bee in 2018. Would go on to win the 2019 North South Foundation Nationals in the Senior Geography Bee
Georgia	Anish Raja	Brookwood Elementary School	Cumming	4th	T-19th	Won the 2018 North South Foundation Nationals in the Junior Geography Bee
Hawaii	William Chen	Kailua Intermediate School	Kailua	7th	T-22nd	Won Hawaii State Bee in 2018
Idaho	Noah Lockey	Cole Valley Christian School	Boise	5th	T-40th	
Illinois	Omkar Gadewar	Madison Junior High School	Naperville	7th	8th	
Indiana	Karthik Varigonda	Central Middle School	Columbus	7th	T-22nd	
Iowa	Simon Kutz	Decorah Middle School	Decorah	7th	21st	
Kansas	Wyatt Boyd	Hocker Grove Middle School	Shawnee	8th	17th	Won the Kansas State Bee in 2018
Kentucky	Taylor Smith	Breckinridge County Middle School	Irvington	8th	T-49th	Placed third in Kentucky in 2018
Louisiana	Andrew Minagar	Caddo Middle Magnet School	Shreveport	8th	T-27th	Won the Louisiana State Bee in 2018
Maine	Jacob LeBrun	Massebesic Middle School	Alfred	7th	42nd	
Maryland	Rishi Kumar	Ellicott Mills Middle School	Ellicott City	8th	3rd	Placed 4th in the nation in 2016
Massachusetts	Atreya Mallanna	William Diamond Middle School	Lexington	6th	2nd	Placed 7th in the nation in 2018
Michigan	Aarush Tutiki	Wass Elementary School	Troy	5th	T-9th	Won the 2017 North South Foundation Nationals in the Junior Geography Bee
Minnesota	Adhithyra Anandaraj	Roosevelt Middle School	Blaine	8th	T-44th	
Mississippi	Sam Connelly	Greater Jackson Area Homeschool Educators	Clinton	8th	46th	
Missouri	Aristuto Paul	Parkway West Middle School	Chesterfield	7th	35th	
Montana	Gabriel Hendrix	Target Range Middle School	Missoula	7th	T-47th	
Nebraska	Advait Singh	Scott Middle School	Lincoln	6th	T-37th	
Nevada	Jack Stark	Challenger School-Lone Mountain	Las Vegas	5th	53rd	
New Hampshire	Luke Szczepiorkowski	Frances C. Richmond Middle School	Hanover	8th	33rd	
New Jersey	Matthew McDonald	Liberty Middle School	West Orange	8th	T- 11th	
New Mexico	Lakshay Sood	Albuquerque Academy	Albuquerque	8th	6th	Only person up to date who has ever won the State Bee for all 5 years of eligibility, from 2015 to 2019
New York	Dylan Rem	Horace Mann School	New York City	8th	7th	Placed Second in New York in 2017
North Carolina	Vaibhav Hariram	Mills Park Middle School	Apex	6th	5th	
North Dakota	Griffin Terras	Discovery Middle School	Fargo	7th	T-44th	
Ohio	Satvik Pochiraju	Olentangy Meadows Elementary School	Lewis Center	5th	T- 11th	Brother of Saket Pochiraju, who tied for 8th in 2018
Oklahoma	Michael Tipton	Summit Middle School	Oklahoma City	8th	15th	
Oregon	Leo Lemann	Wildwood Academy	The Dalles	7th	T-25th	
(American Samoa) (Guam) (Northern Mariana Islands) Pacific Territories	Napu Mesa Blas	Sifa Learning Academy Charter School	Barrigada	8th	T-29th	Won the Pacific Territories Bee in 2018
Pennsylvania	Ben Fischer	Gettysburg Area Middle School	Gettysburg	8th	13th	Won the Pennsylvania State Bee in 2016
Rhode Island	Eli Terrell	Barrington Middle School	Barrington	8th	34th	
South Carolina	Daniel Nirenblatt	Porter-Gaud School	Charleston	8th	T-25th	
South Dakota	Sean Hodges	Edison Middle School	Sioux Falls	7th	T-47th	
Tennessee	Aditya Narayanan	Riverdale Middle and Elementary School	Germantown	8th	14th	Won the 2018 Tennessee State Geographic Bee and the 2017 Arizona State Geographic Bee
Texas	Nihar Janga	Canyon Ridge Middle School	Austin	8th	1st	Co-Champion of the 2016 Scripps National Spelling Bee, tied for 8th in National Geographic Bee in 2018
Utah	Matthew Christensen	Wasatch Home Educators Network	South Jordan	6th	54th	
Vermont	Vegarandhura "Vega" Tariyal	Charlotte Central School	Charlotte	6th	T-37th	
Virginia	Anish Susarla	Belmont Ridge Middle School	Leesburg	8th	T-31st	Placed 5th in the nation in 2017
Washington	Warren Huang	Pacific Cascade Middle School	Issaquah	7th	T-31st	
West Virginia	Joss Poteet	Wildwood Middle School	Shenandoah Junction	8th	T-27th	Won the West Virginia State Bee in 2018
Wisconsin	Adhav Ravikumar	Forest Park Middle School	Franklin	7th	T-19th	Placed second in Wisconsin in 2018
Wyoming	Dillon Davis	Lincoln Middle School	Green River	8th	T-40th	

The state competitions' prize money was increased again from last year. First place got $1000, second place got $300, and third place stayed at $100. The national competitions' college scholarships have decreased, however. The national champion will only receive a $25,000 scholarship, second place will receive a $10,000 scholarship, and third place will receive a $5,000 scholarship.

== Preliminary rounds ==
The 54 state champions competed in the preliminary rounds held from May 19–20, 2019. This part of the contest consisted of 10 oral rounds, as well as a written portion about tackling plastic pollution in various waterways around the world. Both sections were worth 10 points.

The top 10 contestants with the highest scores in the preliminary rounds competed in the semifinals on May 21. After 7 other contestants were eliminated that day, Rishi Kumar of Maryland, Atreya Mallanna from Massachusetts, and Nihar Janga from Texas advanced to the finals, which were held the next day.

Name	State	Preliminary Round Score	Final Placing
Atreya Mallanna	Massachusetts	19/20	2nd
Rishi Kumar	Maryland	18.7/20	3rd
Vaibhav Hariram	North Carolina	18.7/20	5th
Dylan Rem	New York	18.3/20	7th
Jishnu Nayak	California	17.3/20	4th
Kaylan Patel	Florida	17.3/20	T-9th
Lakshay Sood	New Mexico	17.3/20	6th
Omkar Gadewar	Illinois	16.8/20	8th
Aarush Tutiki	Michigan	15.7/20	T-9th
Nihar Janga	Texas	15.7/20	1st

In addition, Matthew McDonald of New Jersey and Satvik Pochiraju of Ohio also finished with 15.7 out of 20 points, but were eliminated by a tiebreaker test the students had taken specifically for the purpose of breaking ties.

== Semi-final and Final Rounds ==
The semi-final competition was held on May 21, 2019. After seven rounds with a mix of individual and common questions, with each question being worth one point, and one lighting round, with three rapid-fire questions being asked, each being worth one point, the four students with the lowest scores were eliminated. Aarush Tutiki of Michigan and Kaylan Patel of Florida were both eliminated and tied for 9th place, along with Omkar Gadewar of Illinois, who finished in 8th place. However, there was a tie that existed between Jishnu Nayak of California, Lakshay Sood of New Mexico, and Dylan Rem of New York, with only two of them being able to advance to the next round. After applying the results of a tiebreaker test that the students took previously, Dylan Rem of New York was eliminated and finished in 7th place. After that, a GeoChallenge Impact round took place. The remaining six contestants were given two photos of the same place, one of the pictures was taken in the past, and one was taken in the last couple of years. Contestants were asked to describe the changes that took place and why they mattered. After this, the three students with the lowest scores were eliminated. Lakshay Sood of New Mexico was eliminated and finished in 6th place, along with Vaibhav Hariram of North Carolina, who finished in 5th place, and Jishnu Nayak of California, who finished in 4th place. After this, Rishi Kumar of Maryland, Atreya Mallanna of Massachusetts, and Nihar Janga of Texas remained and competed in the final rounds the next day.

The Final Rounds were held the next day on May 22, 2019. The three contestants began with a series of five common questions, with each correct answer being awarded one point. After this, it was revealed that the top three contestants were interviewed by the judges for an Impact Challenge round. The videos of these interviews were then displayed. The contestants were first asked why it is important to protect wild places on earth. Afterwards, the contestants were given five choices of places that they believed National Geographic should protect. The choices were Amur(Heilong) River Basin in China, the Carpathian Mountains in Romania, the Congo Basin Tropical Forest in the Republic of the Congo, the Kazakh Steppe in Kazakhstan, and the Murray-Darling River Basin in Australia. All three contestants chose the Congo Basin Tropical Forest. Then, Finalists were asked to explain one step they could take to help protect their chosen location. After this, a Mapmaker round was held. Contestants were asked to draw on a map of the Arctic Region. They were first asked to circle one city on the map that would experience significant economic and population changes, and were then asked to explain why they chose that city. They were then asked to choose two cities that lied beyond the map that would benefit from a new shipping route through the Arctic, and were asked to explain their reasoning. Lastly, they were asked to highlight an area on the map that they believed would need protection as a result of human activity, and were asked to explain their reasoning. After this round, Rishi Kumar of Maryland had the lowest score and was eliminated, finishing in 3rd place. The championship round between Atreya Mallanna of Massachusetts and Nihar Janga of Texas followed. After a series of eight questions, Nihar Janga of Texas correctly answered the question "One-third of Norway’s northernmost county is in what plateau?", putting "Finnmark Plateau" as his answer, becoming the 2019 National Geographic Bee Champion.
