= 20th National Geographic Bee =

2008 American academic competition

- Date: May 21, 2008
- Location: Washington, D.C.
- Winner: Akshay Rajagopal (11 at time of win)
- No. of contestants: 55

The 20th National Geographic Bee was held in Washington, D.C., on May 21, 2008, sponsored by the National Geographic Society. The final competition was moderated by Jeopardy! host Alex Trebek. The winner was Akshay Rajagopal of Lincoln, Nebraska, who won a $25,000 college scholarship and lifetime membership in the National Geographic Society. The 2nd-place winner, Hunter Bledsoe of Alabama, won a $15,000 scholarship. The 3rd-place winner, William Lee of Joyce Middle School in Woburn, Massachusetts, won a $10,000 scholarship.

== State champions ==
- Alabama – Hunter Bledsoe, 8th Grade, Hewitt Trussville Middle School, Trussville
- Alaska – Thomas Long, 8th Grade, Kodiak Middle School, Kodiak
- Arizona – Adam Schilperoort, 7th Grade, Greater Prescott Area Homeschoolers, Prescott Valley
- Arkansas – Eli Westerman, 6th Grade, Fountain Lake Intermediate School, Hot Springs
- California – Nikhil Desai, 8th Grade, Challenger School, Newark
- Colorado – Autumn Hughes, 8th Grade, Christian Home Educators of Colorado, Colorado Springs
- Connecticut – Thomas Denham, 5th Grade, Tokeneke Elementary School, Darien
- Delaware – Daniel Keiser, 8th Grade, Corpus Christi School, Wilmington
- Department of Defense – Forrest Kamperman, 8th Grade, Ramstein Middle School, Germany
- District of Columbia – Benjamin Geyer, 8th Grade, British School of Washington
- Florida – Shiva Kangeyan, 6th Grade, Archimedean Middle Conservatory, Miami
- Georgia – Alexander Krupp, 7th Grade, Chamblee Middle School, Chamblee
- Hawaii – Alexander Fager, 6th Grade, Trinity Lutheran School, Wahiawa
- Idaho – Michael Reynolds, 8th Grade, Taylorview Junior High School, Idaho Falls
- Illinois – Gideon Ticho, 7th Grade, Aveny Coonley School, Downers Grove
- Indiana – Erik Troske, 8th Grade, Barker Middle School, Michigan City
- Iowa – Caleb Olson, 8th Grade, Chariton Middle School, Chariton
- Kansas – Trevor Eggenberger, 5th Grade, Central Christian Academy, Wichita
- Kentucky – Matthew Vaughan, 8th Grade, Jefferson County Home Educators, Louisville
- Louisiana – Barrett Pratt, 6th Grade, St. Joseph Catholic School, Thibodaux
- Maine – Kristopher Kohles, 8th Grade, William S. Cohen School, Bangor
- Maryland – Michael Morris, 8th Grade, Roberto Clemente Middle School, Germantown
- Massachusetts – William Lee, 8th Grade, Joyce Middle School, Woburn
- Michigan – Yunchen Tian, 8th Grade, Hillside Middle School, Northville
- Minnesota – Cody DuBois, 7th Grade, Emerson Spanish Immersion Learning Center, Minneapolis
- Mississippi – Mamadou Fadiga, 6th Grade, Hayes Cooper Center, Merigold
- Missouri – Isaac Pasley, 8th Grade, West Junior High School, Columbia
- Montana – Joseph Perea, 8th Grade, Lincoln County Home Educators, Eureka
- Nebraska – Akshay Rajagopal, 6th Grade, Lux Middle School, Lincoln
- Nevada – Alexander Wade, 5th Grade, Sarah Winnemucca Elementary School, Reno
- New Hampshire – Milan Sandhu, 8th Grade, Ross A. Lurgio Middle School, Bedford
- New Jersey – Christopher Deritis, 8th Grade, St. Rose Grammar School, Belmar
- New Mexico – Elijah Canderlario, 8th Grade, Annunciation Catholic School, Albuquerque
- New York – Jason Leehow, 8th Grade, Andries Hudde Middle School, Brooklyn
- North Carolina – Taylor Morris, 8th Grade, Charles D. Owen Middle School, Swannanoa
- North Dakota – Syed Hyder, 8th Grade, Wachter Middle School, Bismarck
- Ohio – Jonathan Meckler, 8th Grade, Hawken School, Lyndhurst
- Oklahoma – Nicholas Vandivort, 8th Grade, Carver Middle School, Tulsa
- Oregon – Sam Flecker, 5th Grade, Ainsworth Elementary School, Portland
- Pacific Territories – Vinni Orsini, 8th Grade, Grace Christian Academy, Northern Mariana Islands
- Pennsylvania – Joey Zou, 8th Grade, Carson Middle School, Pittsburgh
- Puerto Rico – Sergio Mundo, 8th Grade, Saint John's School, San Juan
- Rhode Island – Daniel Katz, 7th Grade, Jewish Community Day School, Providence
- South Carolina – Justin Hunt, 7th Grade, Gettys Middle School, Easley
- South Dakota – Changlin Ke, 8th Grade, George S. Mickelson Middle School, Brookings
- Tennessee – Jake Simons, 7th Grade, Harding Academy, Nashville
- Texas – Matthew Thomas, 6th Grade, Mary Martin Elementary School, Weatherford
- Utah – Kirk Earl, 8th Grade, Oak Canyon Junior High School, Lindon
- Vermont – Giovanni Fusco, 8th Grade, Bishop John A. Marshall School, Morrisville
- Virginia – Christopher Miller, 7th Grade, Blue Ridge Middle School, Purcellville
- Virgin Islands – Muta Abiff, 8th Grade, Addelita Cancryn Junior High School, St. Thomas
- Washington – Zachary Reshovsky, 8th Grade, Griffin Bay Parent Partner Program, Friday Harbor
- West Virginia – Sam McClung, 6th Grade, John Adams Middle School, Charleston
- Wisconsin – Christian Bakken, 8th Grade, Magellan Middle School, Appleton
- Wyoming – Hunter Collins, 8th Grade, Jackson Hole Middle School, Jackson
