= 21st National Geographic Bee =

2009 American academic competition

- Date: May 20, 2009
- Location: Washington, D.C.
- Winner: Eric Yang (13 at time of win)
- No. of contestants: 54

The 21st National Geographic Bee was held in Washington, D.C., on May 20, 2009, sponsored by the National Geographic Society. The winner was Eric Yang of Griffin Middle School in The Colony, Texas, who won a $25,000 college scholarship, lifetime membership in the National Geographic Society and a trip to the Galápagos Islands with National Geographic Bee moderator and Jeopardy! host Alex Trebek. The 2nd-place winner was Arjun Kandaswamy of Meadow Park Middle School in Beaverton, Oregon. The 3rd-place winner was Shantan Krovvidi of Ligon Middle School in Raleigh, North Carolina.

== 2009 state champions ==
State	Winner's Name	School	City/Town	Grade	Notes	Place
Alabama	Jonathan Hess		Tuscaloosa			
Alaska	Bethany Lee		Anchorage			
Arizona	Nicholas Farnsworth		Flagstaff			Top 10
Arkansas	Zacharay Safley		Beebe			
(Puerto Rico) (United States Virgin Islands) Atlantic Territories	?					
California	Samuel Bressler		Fullerton			
Colorado	Alden Savoca		Debeque			
Connecticut	Robert Chu		Woodbridge			
Delaware	Varun Wadhwa	The Independence School	Newark	6th		
Department of Defense	?					
District of Columbia	Michael Laskowski		Washington			
Florida	Shiva Kangeyan		Miami			Top 10
Georgia	Pranav Bhandarkar	Malcom Bridge Middle School	Bogart	7th		
Hawaii	Alex Fager	Our Savior Lutheran School	Aiea	7th		
Idaho	Karthik Mouli	Hillside Junior High School	Boise	5th		
Illinois	Siva Gangavarapu		Aurora			Top 10
Indiana	Ian Markham	Nativity of Our Savior Catholic School	Portage	7th		
Iowa	Luc Moisan		Grinnell			
Kansas	Trevor Eggenberger		Bel Aire			
Kentucky	Michael Kamer		Lexington			
Louisiana	Amal De Alwis		Hammond			
Maine	Conor Millard		Old Town			
Maryland	Michael Laskowski		University Park			
Massachusetts	Zaroug Jaleel		Lexington			Top 10
Michigan	Kenji Golimlim	Summit Academy	Flat Rock	8th		Top 10
Minnesota	Cody Baird	Jackson Middle School	Champlin			
Mississippi	William Johnston		Diamondhead			
Missouri	Eric Matthews	El Dorado Springs Middle School	El Dorado Springs			
Montana	Thomas Culver		Helena			
Nebraska	Erik Ingram		Bellevue			
Nevada	Alexander Wade	Davidson Academy	Reno	5th		
New Hampshire	Cooper Lecza		Bedford			
New Jersey	Roey Hadar		Fair Haven			
New Mexico	Nicholas Anderson		Albuquerque			
New York	Aidan Langston		Brooklyn			
North Carolina	Shantan Krovvidi	Ligon Middle School	Raleigh			3rd
North Dakota	Casey Murphy		Carrington			
Ohio	Nick Merchant		Dublin			
Oklahoma	Nathan Thompson		Edmond			
Oregon	Arjun Kandaswamy	Meadow Park Middle School	Beaverton			2nd
(American Samoa) (Guam) (Northern Mariana Islands) Pacific Territories	?					
Pennsylvania	Henry Glitz	St. Bernard School	Pittsburgh			
Rhode Island	Oliver Lucier	Curtis Corner Middle School	Wakefield	7th		
South Carolina	Luke Porter		Columbia			
South Dakota	Alex Kimn	George S. Mickelson Middle School	Brookings	6th		
Tennessee	Joseph Peterson		Memphis			
Texas	Eric Yang	Griffin Middle School	The Colony			Champion
Utah	Kennen Sparks		Kaysville			Top 10
Vermont	Roger Danilek		Norwich			
Virginia	Sidharth Verma		Herndon			
Washington	Benjamin Salman		Seattle			
West Virginia	Jacob Ramthun	Athens Elementary	Athens			
Wisconsin	Vansh Jain	Minocqua-Hazelhurst-Lake Tomahawk Elementary	Minocqua	5th		Top 10
Wyoming	Kirsi Anselmi-Stith		Rock Springs			
