= 28th National Geographic Bee =

2016 American academic competition

- Date: May 22–25, 2016
- Location: Washington, D.C.
- Winner: Rishi Nair (12 at time of win)
- No. of contestants: 54

The 28th annual National Geographic Bee was held between May 22–25, 2016 in Washington, DC. For the first time, the bee was moderated by the American humorist, journalist and actor Mo Rocca and featured a grand prize of a $50,000 college scholarship. The champion was Rishi Nair of Williams Magnet Middle School in Tampa, Florida, who won the $50,000 scholarship, lifetime membership to the National Geographic Society, and a Lindblad expedition to southeast Alaska. The 2nd-place winner was Saketh Jonnalagadda of Stony Brook Middle School in Westford, Massachusetts, who won a $25,000 scholarship. The 3rd-place winner was Kapil Nathan of Brock's Gap Intermediate School in Hoover, Alabama, who won a $10,000 scholarship. Rishi was also the First sixth-grade National Champion since 2008.

== 2016 State Champions ==
State	Name	School	City/Town	Grade	Place
Alabama	Kapil Nathan	Brock's Gap Intermediate School	Hoover	6th	3rd
Alaska	Ben Ng	Floyd Dryden Middle School	Juneau	8th	
Arizona	Ari Mehta	Explorer Middle School	Phoenix	8th	
Arkansas	D. J. Quezada	Haas Hall Academy	Bentonville	8th	
(Puerto Rico) (United States Virgin Islands) Atlantic Territories	Matthew Haughton	Antilles School	St. Thomas, VI	7th	
California	Nishaanth Krishnan	Utt Middle School	Tustin	8th	
Colorado	Cooper Hanley	Louisville Middle School	Louisville	7th	
Connecticut	Ritwik Bose	Scotts Ridge Middle School	Ridgefield	8th	
Delaware	Eric Smith	Postlethwait Middle School	Camden	8th	
Department of Defense	Connor Buchheit	Wiesbaden Middle School	Wiesbaden, Germany	7th	
District of Columbia	Max Garon	Sidwell Friends Middle School	Washington, DC	6th	
Florida	Rishi Nair	Williams Magnet Middle School	Tampa	6th	Champion
Georgia	Jerome Perera	Taylor Road Middle School	Johns Creek	7th	
Hawaii	Mika Ishii	Kaimuki Middle School	Honolulu	8th	
Idaho	Nicholas Monahan	Payette Lakes Middle School	McCall	7th	
Illinois	Mantra Dave	Chiddix Junior High School	Normal	8th	
Indiana	Simon Molenaar	Highland Christian School	Highland	7th	
Iowa	Patrick Taylor	Northwest Junior High School	Coralville	8th	
Kansas	Aviral Misra	Prairie Star Middle School	Leawood	8th	
Kentucky	Shyam Ravishankar	Noe Middle School	Louisville	8th	
Louisiana	Luke Andel	Isidore Newman School	New Orleans	8th	
Maine	Haden Buzzell	Massabesic Middle School	East Waterboro	6th	
Maryland	Rishi Kumar	Worthington Elementary School	Ellicott City	5th	T-4
Massachusetts	Saketh Jonnalagadda	Stony Brook Middle School	Westford	8th	2nd
Michigan	Pranav Arunandhi	Reuther Middle School	Rochester Hills	8th	
Minnesota	Lucas Eggers	STAR Homeschool Academy	Minnetonka	7th	7th
Mississippi	Edmund Doerksen	Oxford Middle School	Oxford	7th	
Missouri	Nikhil Krishnan	Rockwood South Middle School	Fenton	8th	
Montana	Grace Rembert	Sacajawea Middle School	Bozeman	8th	T-4
Nebraska	Deeksha Sridhar	Millard North Middle School	Omaha	6th	
Nevada	Spencer Gabe	Las Vegas Day School	Las Vegas	8th	
New Hampshire	Abhinav Govindaraju	Shaker Road School	Concord	6th	
New Jersey	Veda Bhattaram	Robert R. Lazar Middle School	Montville	6th	
New Mexico	Lakshay Sood	Manzano Day School	Albuquerque	5th	
New York	Ethan Tsvayg	Mark Twain Intermediate School 239	Brooklyn/Staten Island	7th	
North Carolina	Samanyu Dixit	Jay M. Robinson Middle School	Charlotte	6th	T-8
North Dakota	Jonathan Farnsworth	Valley Middle School	Grand Forks	8th	
Ohio	Saket Pochiraju	Olentangy Orange Middle School	Lewis Center	6th	
Oklahoma	Keane VanTrease	Jenks Middle School	Jenks	8th	
Oregon	Ashwin Sivakumar	Oregon Episcopal School	Portland	6th	T-8
(American Samoa) (Guam) (Northern Mariana Islands) Pacific Territories	Victoria Nicole Santos	Marianas Baptist Academy	Saipan, MP	7th	
Pennsylvania	Benjamin Fischer	Vida Charter School	Gettysburg	5th	
Rhode Island	Eli Fulton	Rhode Island of Home Educators	Rumford	8th	
South Carolina	Joshua Woodfin	Greenville County Home Educators	Simpsonville	8th	
South Dakota	Owen Fink	Bridgewater-Emery School	Bridgewater	5th	
Tennessee	John Webster	Evangelical Christian School	Cordova	8th	
Texas	Pranay Varada	DeWitt Perry Middle School	Carrollton	7th	6th
Utah	Ankit Garg	Bear River Charter School	Logan	6th	
Vermont	Isaac Krementsov	Shelburne Community School	Shelburne	7th	
Virginia	Vishvesha Sridhar	Blacksburg Middle School	Blacksburg	8th	
Washington	Satvik Kabbur	Bear Creek Elementary School	Woodinville	4th	
West Virginia	Surya Perla	Andrew Jackson Middle School	Charleston	8th	
Wisconsin	Thomas Wright	University School of Milwaukee	Milwaukee	7th	T-8
Wyoming	Degory Day	Evanston Middle School	Evanston	7th	

== Preliminary rounds ==
Ten preliminary rounds held on May 23, 2016. Each State Champion had to answer ten oral questions, and prior to their arrival in Washington, D.C., had to submit a video related to a topic. The video was worth up to six points, hence the highest possible number of points was 16. One 16 and 4 15s were scored. A 9-way tie for 14 pts was broken with 4 exiting the competition. The ten finalists were announced around 11:30. The top ten finalists were as follows:

- Kapil Nathan- from Alabama; 14/16 (9/10 + 5/6)
- Rishi Nair- from Florida; 15/16 (10/10 + 5/6)
- Rishi Kumar- from Maryland; 14/16 (8/10 + 6/6)
- Saketh Jonnalagadda- from Massachusetts; 14/16 (9/10 + 5/6)
- Lucas Eggers- from Minnesota; 16/16 (10/10 + 6/6) (only one with a perfect score in the preliminary rounds)
- Grace Rembert- from Montana; 15/16 (10/10 + 5/6)
- Samanyu Dixit- from North Carolina; 15/16 (10/10 + 5/6)
- Ashwin Sivakumar- from Oregon; 15/16 (9/10 + 6/6)
- Pranay Varada- from Texas; 14/16 (9/10 + 5/6)
- Thomas Wright- from Wisconsin; 14/16 (9/10 + 5/6)

== Final rounds ==
The finals consisted of questions regarding the U.S. through Rounds 1–5, with 4 eliminated once Round 5 was over. A tie existed between Rishi Kumar and Lucas Eggers, with the latter exiting the competition. After that, questions regarding the world appeared. A three-way tie existed between Grace Rembert, Rishi Kumar again, and Kapil Nathan with the latter entering the final three. After Nathan was eliminated, the final two moved on to the Championships – Jonnalagadda and Nair. The latter won the competition.
