= 15th National Geographic Bee =

2003 American academic competition

- Date: May 21, 2003
- Location: Washington, D.C.
- Winner: James Williams (14 at time of win)
- No. of contestants: 55

The 15th National Geographic Bee was held in Washington, D.C., on May 21, 2003, sponsored by the National Geographic Society and ING. The final competition was moderated by Jeopardy! host Alex Trebek. The winner was James Williams, a homeschooled student from Vancouver, Washington, who won a $25,000 college scholarship, lifetime membership in the National Geographic Society, and a trip to a Busch Gardens/Sea World Adventure Camp. The 2nd-place winner, Dallas Simons of Martin Luther King Magnet School in Nashville, Tennessee, won a $15,000 scholarship. The 3rd-place winner, Sean Rao of St. Gabriel School in Hubertus, Wisconsin, won a $10,000 scholarship.

== 2003 State Champions ==
State	Winner's Name	Grade	School	City/Town	Notes
Arkansas	Jacob Felts	8th	Hardy	Top 10 finalist	
Colorado	Kathryn Prose	Denver	Top 10 finalist		
District of Columbia	Thomas Meyerson	7th	Top 10 finalist		
Florida	David Goldman	8th	Fort Lauderdale	Top 10 finalist	
Hawaii	Eric Liaw	5th	Punahou Junior High School	Honolulu	
Kansas	Andrew Wojtanik	7th	Overland Park		
Michigan	Jamie Ding	6th	East Middle School	Canton	
Minnesota	Nathan Cornelius	5th	Cottonwood		
Ohio	Christopher Butler	Shaker Heights	Top 10 finalist		
Oklahoma	Christopher Chesny	7th	Claremore		
Oregon	Samuel Brandt	6th	Roosevelt Middle School	Eugene	Top 10 finalist
Rhode Island	Karan Takhar	6th	Gordon School	East Providence	Top 10 finalist
Tennessee	Dallas Simons	Martin Luther King Magnet School	Nashville	Second Place	
Texas	Sameer Ahmed	7th	Rice Middle School	Plano	
Utah	Kevin Chen Ni	8th	Churchill Junior High School	Millcreek	
Washington	James Williams	8th	Vancouver	2003 Champion	
Wisconsin	Sean Rao	8th	St. Gabriel School	Hubertus	Third Place
