= 14th National Geographic Bee =

2002 American academic competition

- Date: May 22, 2002
- Location: Washington, D.C.
- Winner: Calvin McCarter (10 at time of win)
- No. of contestants: 55

The 14th National Geographic Bee was held in Washington, D.C., on May 22, 2002, sponsored by the National Geographic Society. The final competition was moderated by Jeopardy! host Alex Trebek. The winner was Calvin McCarter, a homeschooled student from Jenison, Michigan, who won a $25,000 college scholarship and lifetime membership in the National Geographic Society. As of 2019, McCarter is the only 5th grader to have won the competition. The 2nd-place winner, Matthew Russell of Bradford, Pennsylvania, won a $15,000 scholarship. The 3rd-place winner, Erik Miller of Kent, Washington, won a $10,000 scholarship.

== 2002 State Champions ==
| State | Winner's Name | Grade | School | City/Town | Place | Notes |
|---|---|---|---|---|---|---|
| Colorado | Isaiah P. Hess | Top 10 finalist | | | | |
| Connecticut | Aaron Kiersh | Top 10 finalist | | | | |
| Department of Defense | Ryan J. Felix | 8th | won the Department of Defense Bee in 2001 | Top 10 finalist | | |
| Kansas | Benjamin S. Detrixhe | 5th | Ames Elementary School | Ames | Top 10 finalist (9th place) | Won the Kansas State Bee in 2001 |
| Michigan | Calvin McCarter | 5th | Jenison | 2002 Champion | | |
| New York | Nathaniel R. Mattison | Top 10 finalist | | | | |
| North Carolina | Alexander Taylor Smith | Top 10 finalist | | | | |
| North Dakota | John Rice | 8th | Maddock | Won the North Dakota State Bee in 2000 and 2001 | Top 10 finalist | |
| Pennsylvania | Matthew Russell | Bradford | Second Place | | | |
| Utah | Derek Wells | 5th | Pinnacle Canyon Academy | Wellington | | |
| Washington | Erik Miller | Kent | Third Place | | | |
