= 3rd National Geographic Bee =

1991 American academic competition

- Date: May 23, 1991
- Location: Washington, D.C.
- Winner: David Stillman (14 at time of win)
- No. of contestants: 57

The 3rd National Geographic Bee was held in Washington, D.C., on May 23, 1991, sponsored by the National Geographic Society. The final competition was moderated by Jeopardy! host Alex Trebek. The winner was David Stillman of Craigmont, Idaho, who won a $25,000 college scholarship. The 2nd-place winner, Carlos De La Fuente of Chandler, Arizona, won a $15,000 scholarship. The 3rd-place winner, Eliot Brenner of Richmond, Virginia, won a $10,000 scholarship.

== 1991 State Champions ==
| State | Winner's Name | Grade | School | City/Town | Notes |
|---|---|---|---|---|---|
| Arizona | Carlos de la Fuente | 6th | Chandler | Second Place | |
| Idaho | David Stillman | 8th | Craigmont | 1991 Champion | |
| Kentucky | Matthew Coldiron | 8th | Somerset | Top 10 finalist | |
| Maine | Liam Burnell | Falmouth | Top 10 finalist | | |
| Maryland | Danny Dudis | 8th | Pocomoke City | Top 10 finalist | |
| Mississippi | Stephen Gent | 8th | Gulfport | Top 10 finalist | |
| Missouri | Joe Turner | 8th | Bernie | Top 10 finalist | |
| Ohio | Tom Barringer | Delta | Top 10 finalist | | |
| Pennsylvania | Rob Leitner | 8th | Carlisle | Top 10 finalist | |
| Virginia | Eliot Brenner | Richmond | Third Place | | |
| Washington | Lawson Fite | 7th | Shumway Middle School | Vancouver | |
