= 17th National Geographic Bee =

2005 American academic competition

- Date: May 25, 2005
- Location: Washington, D.C.
- Winner: Nathan Cornelius (13 at time of win)
- No. of contestants: 55

The 17th National Geographic Bee was held in Washington, D.C., on May 25, 2005, sponsored by the National Geographic Society. The final competition was moderated by Jeopardy! host Alex Trebek. The winner was Nathan Cornelius, a homeschooled student from Cottonwood, Minnesota, who won a $25,000 college scholarship and lifetime membership in the National Geographic Society. The 2nd-place winner, Karan Takhar of the Gordon School in East Providence, Rhode Island, won a $15,000 scholarship. The 3rd-place winner, Samuel Brandt of Roosevelt Middle School in Eugene, Oregon, won a $10,000 scholarship.

== 2005 State Champions ==
State	Winner's Name	Grade	School	City/Town	Notes	
Florida	Jesse Weinberg	8th	Coral Gables	Top 10 finalist		
Illinois	Bonny Jain	7th	Woodrow Wilson Middle School	Moline	Top 10 finalist (4th place)	
Kansas	Benjamin S. Detrixhe	8th	Concordia Middle School	Concordia	Top 10 finalist (7th place)	Won the Kansas State Bee in 2001 and 2002
Massachusetts	Krishnan Chandra	7th	Won the Massachusetts State Bee in 2004			
Michigan	Jamie Ding	8th	Parcells Middle School	Grosse Pointe Woods	Top 10 finalist	Won the Michigan State Bee in 2003
Minnesota	Nathan Cornelius	7th	Cottonwood	2005 Champion		
Missouri	Matthew Thampy	St. Peters	Top 10 finalist			
New Jersey	Tejas Raje	8th	Princeton	Top 10 finalist		
Oregon	Samuel Brandt	8th	Roosevelt Middle School	Eugene	Third Place	
Rhode Island	Karan Takhar	8th	Gordon school	East Providence	Second Place	
Washington	Max Sugarman	7th	Pine Lake Middle School	Issaquah	Top 10 finalist	
