= 2nd National Geographic Bee =

1990 American academic competition

- Date: May 24, 1990
- Location: Washington, D.C.
- Winner: Susannah Batko-Yovino (11 at time of win)
- No. of contestants: 57

The 2nd National Geographic Bee was held in Washington, D.C., on May 24, 1990, sponsored by the National Geographic Society. The final competition was moderated by Jeopardy! host Alex Trebek. The winner was Susannah Batko-Yovino of the Washington-Jefferson School in Altoona, Pennsylvania, who won a $25,000 college scholarship. The 2nd-place winner, Tim Forest of C.J. Hooker Middle School in Goshen, New York, won a $15,000 scholarship. The 3rd-place winner, Martin Hohner of Luther Burbank School in Chicago, Illinois, won a $10,000 scholarship.
