= 30th National Geographic Bee =

2018 American academic competition

- Date: May 20–23, 2018
- Location: Washington, D.C.
- Winner: Venkat Ranjan (13 at time of win)
- No. of contestants: 54

The 30th annual National Geographic Bee was held in Washington, D.C., and was hosted by Mo Rocca. It is sponsored by the National Geographic Society. The State Bees were held on April 6, where the 54 finalists were determined. The 2018 National Geographic Bee champion was Venkat Ranjan of California.

== State Bees ==
On April 6, 2018, the National Geographic State Bees were held across the 50 states, Washington, D.C., the Atlantic Territories, the Pacific Territories, and the Department of Defense. Fifty-four State or Territory level Champions were determined. In 2018, the prize for winning the state bee has been raised, as $200 is now given to the winner instead of $100, the old prize. The winners have also received a National Geographic Visual Atlas of the World, Second Edition. Second- and third-place winners received $150 and $100, respectively. The state preliminary rounds (there were 8 total) consisted of rounds about U.S. geography, international geography, current events, national birds, protecting the environment, Weird but True, and a "GeoChallenge". The GeoChallenge was a True/False round where a statement would be made about a U.S. state's population, GDP, or size, comparing it to another country, and the student would have to say if it was True or False. For example, one question was "Virginia has a higher GDP than Portugal, True or False?"-the answer is true. All 54 regional champions received an all-expenses paid trip to Washington, D.C., to compete at the national competition from May 20–23. The National Geographic Bee is an academic competition for 4th-8th grade students at: "public schools, private schools, and homeschools in the United States and its territories, as well as the Department of Defense Dependents Schools (DoDDS).

=== State Champions as National Contestants (T=Tie) ===
State	Name	School	City/Town	Grade	Place
Alabama	Christian Martin	Echols Middle School	Northport	8th	T-30th
Alaska	Riley Gross	Ocean View Elementary School	Anchorage	6th	T-45th
Arizona	Gayatri Kaimal	BASIS Tucson North School	Tucson	7th	T-4th
Arkansas	Wesley Bonner	Lake Hamilton Junior High School	Hot Springs	8th	T-34th
(Puerto Rico) (United States Virgin Islands) Atlantic Territories	Diego Curet	St. John's School	San Juan	8th	T-53rd
California	Venkat Ranjan	Windemere Ranch Middle School	San Ramon	8th	1st
Colorado	Garrett Fleischmann	Stargate Middle School	Thornton	7th	T-22nd
Connecticut	James Leone	Middlesex Middle School	Darien	8th	T-17th
Delaware	Jeremiah Rayban	Cab Calloway School of the Arts	Wilmington	7th	T-24th
Department of Defense	Alex Daniels	Seoul Am Middle School	Seoul, South Korea	7th	T-12th
District of Columbia	Max Garon	Sidwell Friends Middle School	Washington	8th	T-12th
Florida	Kaylan Patel	Windermere Preparatory School	Windermere	6th	T-17th
Georgia	Vishal Sareddy	Riverwatch Middle School	Suwanee	8th	3rd
Hawaii	William Chen	Aikahi Elementary	Kailua	6th	T-38th
Idaho	Vincent Giordano	Lowell Scott Middle School	Boise	8th	T-42nd
Illinois	Ty Jones	Crestwood School	Paris	8th	T-38th
Indiana	Jonathon Elliott	Griffith Middle School	Griffith	7th	T-30th
Iowa	Kavya Kalathur	Pleasant Valley Junior High School	LeClaire	8th	T-17th
Kansas	Wyatt Boyd	Hocker Grove Middle School	Shawnee	7th	T-24th
Kentucky	Case W. Grillot	Highlands Middle School	Fort Thomas	8th	T-24th
Louisiana	Andrew Minagar	Caddo Middle School	Shreveport	7th	T-34th
Maine	Colin Aponte	Hancock Co. Area Homeschoolers	Blue Hill	8th	T-42nd
Maryland	Alan Zhang	Mount View Middle School	Marriottsville	8th	T-45th
Massachusetts	Atreya Mallanna	Joseph Estabrook Elementary School	Lexington	5th	7th
Michigan	Paarth Sharma	Moorsbridge Elementary School	Portage	5th	T-12th
Minnesota	Nicholas Peterson	St. John Baptist School	New Brighton	8th	T-24th
Mississippi	Jacob Holland	Long Beach Middle School	Long Beach	8th	T-38th
Missouri	Jackson Cooper	Christ The King School	University City	7th	T-45th
Montana	Caleb Mark	Yellowstone County Home Educators	Billings	8th	T-53rd
Nebraska	Quentin Bauer	Central Middle School	Omaha	7th	T-45th
Nevada	Emmanuel Gayton-Vargas	Carson Valley Middle School	Gardnerville	7th	T-45th
New Hampshire	Sean Cheng	Cooperative Middle School	Stratham	8th	10th
New Jersey	Anoushka Buddhikot	Bridgewater-Raritan Middle School	Bridgewater	8th	2nd
New Mexico	Lakshay Sood	Albuquerque Academy	Albuquerque	7th	T-12th
New York	Nicholas Sarris	West Hollow Middle School	Melville	8th	T-45th
North Carolina	Jonathan Song	Salem Middle School	Apex	8th	6th
North Dakota	Krishna Kamalakannan	Discovery Middle School	Fargo	8th	11th
Ohio	Saket Pochiraju	Orange Middle School	Lewis Center	8th	T-8th
Oklahoma	Dyllon Wheeler	Epic Charter Schools	Oklahoma City	8th	T-45th
Oregon	Ashwin Sivakumar	Oregon Episcopal School	Portland	8th	T-4th
(American Samoa) (Guam) (Northern Mariana Islands) Pacific Territories	Napu Mesa Blas	Luis P. Untalan Middle School	Barrigada	7th	T-34th
Pennsylvania	Arnab Sircar	Charles F. Patton Middle School	Kennett Square	8th	T-17th
Rhode Island	Maximus Terra	Alan Shawn Feinstein Middle School	Coventry	8th	T-38th
South Carolina	Sam Henshaw	Moultrie Middle School	Mt. Pleasant	7th	T-22nd
South Dakota	Owen Fink	Bridgewater-Emery School	Bridgewater	7th	T-34th
Tennessee	Aditya Narayanan	Riverdale Elementary School	Germantown	6th	T-30th
Texas	Nihar Janga	Canyon Ridge Middle School	Austin	7th	T-8th
Utah	Felix Keil	Salt Lake Arts Academy	Salt Lake City	8th	T-17th
Vermont	Mary Fowler	Eastern Vermont Homeschooler	Hartland	7th	T-45th
Virginia	Caleb Hines	Ashburn Homeschoolers	Ashburn	8th	T-24th
Washington	Ihsan Lishar	Spiritridge Elementary School	Bellevue	5th	T-12nd
West Virginia	Joss Poteet	Wildwood Middle School	Shenandoah Junction	7th	T-24th
Wisconsin	Hansen Jin	Kromrey Middle School	Middleton	8th	16th
Wyoming	Preston Buehler	Star Valley Middle School	Afton	8th	T-30th

== Preliminary Rounds & Final Competition ==
The 54 state champions competed in the preliminary rounds held from May 21–22, 2018. This part of the contest consisted of 10 oral rounds as well as a written portion.

The top 10 contestants with the highest scores in the preliminary rounds competed in the final round, which was held on May 23, 2018. Venkat Ranjan from California was the champion, with Anoushka Buddhikot from New Jersey coming 2nd, and Vishal Sareddy from Georgia placing third.

National Championship Final Contestants
Name	State	Preliminary Round Scores	Final Placing
Sean Cheng	New Hampshire	19/20 (10/10 + 9/10)	10th
Gayatri Kaimal	Arizona	18/20 (10/10 + 8/10)	4th
Venkat Ranjan	California	18/20 (9/10 + 9/10)	1st
Atreya Mallanna	Massachusetts	18/20 (10/10 + 8/10)	7th
Anoushka Buddhikot	New Jersey	18/20 (10/10 + 8/10)	2nd
Jonathan Song	North Carolina	18/20 (8/10 + 10/10)	6th
Saket Pochiraju	Ohio	18/20 (9/10 + 9/10)	8th
Vishal Sareddy	Georgia	17/20 (8/10 + 9/10)	3rd
Ashwin Sivakumar	Oregon	17/20 (8/10 + 9/10)	4th
Nihar Janga	Texas	17/20 (10/10 + 7/10)	8th

- Krishna Kamalakannan, of North Dakota, also finished with 17 out of 20 points but was eliminated by a tiebreaker test the students had taken specifically for the purpose of breaking ties.
