= 22nd National Geographic Bee =

2010 American academic competition

- Date: May 26, 2010
- Location: Washington, D.C.
- Winner: Aadith Moorthy (13 at time of win)
- No. of contestants: 54

The 22nd National Geographic Bee was held in Washington, D.C. on May 26, 2010, sponsored by the National Geographic Society. 13-year-old Aadith Moorthy of the state of Florida was the champion.

== 2010 state champions ==
State	Winner's Name	School	City/Town	Grade	Notes
Alabama	James Niiler	Rock Quarry Middle School	Tuscaloosa	6th	
Alaska	Nathan Swan	Interior Distance Education of Alaska	Anchorage	7th	
Arizona	Arun Yadav	Greenbriar Elementary School	Phoenix	5th	
Arkansas	Grant Baker	Alma Middle School	Alma	8th	
(Puerto Rico) (United States Virgin Islands) Atlantic Territories	Jorge Asenjo	Academia del Perpetuo Socorro	San Juan, Puerto Rico	8th	
California	Alek S Venturino	Charlotte Wood Middle School	Danville	8th	
Colorado	Isabella Contolini	Red Rocks Elementary School	Morrison	6th	Only female 2010 state champion
Connecticut	Darius Mostaghimi	Walter C. Polson Middle School	Madison	8th	
Delaware	Varun Wadhwa	The Independence School	Newark	7th	
Department of Defense	William Miller	Heidelberg Middle School	Heidelberg, Germany	7th	
District of Columbia	Matthew Wilson	Blessed Sacrament School	Washington, D.C.	5th	
Florida	Aadith Moorthy	Palm Harbor Middle School	Palm Harbor	8th	National Champion
Georgia	Pranav Bhandarkar	Malcom Bridge Middle School	Bogart	8th	Top ten finalist (6th Place)
Hawaii	Alex Fager	Our Savior Lutheran School	Aiea	8th	
Idaho	Karthik Mouli	Hillside Junior High School	Boise	6th	Third place
Illinois	Anton Karpovich	Walter R. Sundling Junior High School	Palatine	8th	
Indiana	Ian Markham	Nativity of Our Savior Catholic School	Portage	8th	
Iowa	Johannes Gassman	Ames Homeschool Assistance Program	Ames	7th	
Kansas	Stefan Petrovic	Broken Arrow School	Lawrence	6th	Top ten finalist (4th Place)
Kentucky	Nolan Phillips	Montessori Middle School of Kentucky	Lexington	8th	
Louisiana	Anthony Stoner	Christian Brothers School	Gretna	6th	
Maine	James Davis III	Sabattus Central School	Sabattus	8th	
Maryland	Thomas Naatz	Norwood School	Bethesda	6th	
Massachusetts	Abhinav Kurada	Amsa Charter School	Littleton	6th	Top ten finalist (5th Place)
Michigan	Jacob Tanner	Saline Middle School	Saline	7th	
Minnesota	Gopi Ramanathan	Sartell Middle School	Sartell	7th	
Mississippi	Mamadou Fadiga	Margaret Green Junior High School	Cleveland	8th	
Missouri	Joshua Vogel	Trinity Lutheran School	Cape Girardeau	7th	
Montana	Erik Ellis	Yellowstone County Home Educators	Hardin		
Nebraska	Zebulon Cooper	Prague Public School	Prague	8th	
Nevada	Alexander Wade	Davidson Academy	Reno	6th	
New Hampshire	David Ferreira	Amherst Middle School	Amherst	8th	
New Jersey	David Yin	Thomas R. Grover Middle School	West Windsor	8th	
New Mexico	Joseph Couls	Our Lady of the Annunciation Catholic School	Albuquerque	7th	
New York	Richard Zhang	Jericho Middle School	Jericho	8th	
North Carolina	Logan Shaut	Blowing Rock Elementary School	Blowing Rock	8th	
North Dakota	Micah Mabin	Wachter Middle School	Bismarck	8th	
Ohio	Evan Nichols	St. Hilary School	Fairlawn	7th	
Oklahoma	Nicholas Payne	Pioneer Junior High School	Waukomis	8th	
Oregon	Samuel Coste	Greater Salem Home Educators	Salem	7th	
(American Samoa) (Guam) (Northern Mariana Islands) Pacific Territories	Matteo Tanak	Bishop Baumgartner Memorial Catholic School	Guam	8th	
Pennsylvania	Jacob Zimmer	James S. Wilson Middle School	Erie	7th	
Rhode Island	Oliver Lucier	Curtis Corner Middle School	Wakefield	8th	2nd Place
South Carolina	Kelvin Davis	Williston-Elko Middle School	Williston	7th	
South Dakota	Alex Kimn	George S. Mickelson Middle School	Brookings	7th	
Tennessee	Simon Crow	Robertsville Middle School	Oak Ridge	8th	
Texas	Tine Valencic	Colleyville Middle School	Colleyville	6th	
Utah	Anthony Cheng	Peruvian Park Elementary School	Sandy	6th	Top ten finalist (6th Place)
Vermont	William Hodgson-Walker	Charlotte Central School	Charlotte	7th	
Virginia	James Stiff	St. Mary's Catholic School	Richmond	8th	Top ten finalist (9th Place)
Washington	Alec Sjoholm	Terrace Park Elementary School	Mountlake Terrace	6th	
West Virginia	Andrew Braun	Hurricane Middle School	Hurricane	8th	Top ten finalist (9th Place)
Wisconsin	Vansh Jain	Minocqua-Hazelhurst-Lake Tomahawk Elementary	Minocqua	6th	Top ten finalist (6th Place) Was a finalist in 2009
Wyoming	Zachery Dubisz	Star Valley Middle School	Afton	8th	
