= National Geographic Bee =

Geography competition held in American schools

National Geographic GeoBee
- Status: Discontinued (2021)
- Genre: Geography bee
- Frequency: Annual (late May)
- Location: Washington, D.C.
- Years active: 32
- Inaugurated: 1989
- Most recent: 2019
- Participants: 2.4 million (as of the 2019 Bee)
- Patron: National Geographic Society
- Website: www.nationalgeographic.org/bee

The National Geographic GeoBee (called the National Geographic Bee from 2001 to 2018, also referred to as the Nat Geo Bee) was an annual geography contest sponsored by the National Geographic Society. The bee, held annually from 1989 to 2019, was open to students in the fourth through eighth grades in participating schools from the United States.

The entities represented at the national level came from all fifty U.S. states, all the territories, the Department of Defense Dependents Schools (DoDDS), and the District of Columbia.

The National Geographic Bee Finals were moderated by Jeopardy! host Alex Trebek for its first 25 years (1989–2013). At the 2013 National Geographic Bee, Trebek announced that 2013 would be his last year hosting the Finals. Newscaster Soledad O'Brien took his place the following year, moderating the bee in 2014 and 2015. O'Brien was then replaced by Mo Rocca, who would host from 2016 to the final competition in 2019.

In 2020, the Bee was canceled due to the COVID-19 pandemic. The 2021 edition was also canceled after a 75 percent drop in school registrations. The National Geographic Society later announced that the Bee had been "permanently discontinue[d]... to make way for new, transformative, and innovative geography education opportunities in which students around the globe can more equitably participate."

== Procedure ==
=== School competitions ===
The competition began at the elementary school and middle school levels (4th grade - 8th grade) and usually occurred in November, December, or January. This competition required at least 6 people to enter. Private schools, public schools, and homeschooled students were allowed to enter. Typically, between five and six million students entered each year (any number of competitors could enter this competition). The two major stages in this competition were called the preliminary and the final stages. Often, the preliminary competition was further split into preliminary rounds and a semi-final. In the event of a tie, a tiebreaker round was held at the end of the preliminary rounds.

In the preliminary rounds, competitors were divided into groups of twenty and each contestant is asked one question from each of the seven themed rounds. Categories included:

- Cultural Geography
- Economic Geography
- Across-the-Country, Around-the-World
- Science
- Geographic Comparisons
- Physical Geography
- Odd-Item-Out (a category where one contestant was given three choices, plus a description; the contestant had to determine which of the three choices does not fit)

Contestants were awarded 1 point per question. At the end of seven rounds, players with the top ten scores advance to the finals. In addition to the game, a player could ask for a repeat of a spelling during these rounds. However, they were restricted to only asking twice in duration of the entire geographic bee.

Quite often there was a tie, in which case a semi-final tiebreaker round was needed. For example, if six players finished the preliminary rounds with eight points and fifteen finished with seven points, the six who finished with eight points automatically advanced to the final competition. The fifteen with seven points moved into the semi-final round where the top four were determined to fill the remainder of the seats in the finals. This was done by asking every player the same question at the same time and giving each player twelve seconds to write down the answer. Each question was automatically repeated twice. Everyone revealed their answer at the end of the twelve seconds and players were eliminated on a single-elimination basis. If, using the above example of four open seats in the finals, there was a question where eight players are left in the semi-final round and three players got the question right, those three advance to the finals. The other five who got the question wrong continued with the single-elimination procedure to determine which competitor would take the last open seat in the finals. A player could not ask judges to spell or repeat words in the semi-final round.

The final competition consisted of two parts: the final round and the championship round. Each of the ten finalists started with a clean slate and was eliminated after the second incorrect answer. This continued until the number of contestants drops from ten to two and a third-place finisher was determined. A player was not officially eliminated until the end of a series of questions, since if all but one competitor made their second miss in that round, all the players stayed in the competition. Again, a player could ask for a spelling or repeat on any question, but only once per question. Earlier in the round, questions could require oral answers or written answers from all the competitors at one time. Quite often, many of the earlier questions in this round contained visuals as part of the question, such as maps or pictures. Question examples included pictures of state quarters with the name rubbed off and maps of the US with national forests shown and numbered. Contestants, at the time, were given the name of the national forest and had to match states with trees. At the national level, competitions could include items such as flags, musical instruments, hats, and even live animals. After a certain round, all questions required oral answers only.

If there was a tie for the championship round or third place, there would be an elimination round. For example, if four players are left and three made their second mistake, the fourth advances to the championship round and the other three enter the tiebreaker. The moderator then asked each of the three players, at the same time, to write their answers to the same question. In this special round, questions could be repeated by players but they could not ask how to spell a given word. As a result, if one of three responses was correct, the player would rise to the championship round and the other two moved to the tiebreaker round until a third-place winner determined.

In the championship round, both players started with a clean slate again. The moderator asked both contestants the same question at the same time, repeated twice, and both players had fifteen seconds to write their answer. Both players then showed their answers and each player who wrote a correct answer received one point. There were three questions in the championship round. The player with the most points at the end was the champion. If both players were tied at the end, the competition entered the championship tiebreaker round. The rules were the same as for the championship round, except that the last player to answer a question incorrectly was the runner-up.

In 2010, National Geographic partnered with mobile development company Concentric Sky to launch a series of official app-based study tools titled Geobee Challenge.

Qualifying Test

The Qualifying Test was the only part of the bee that is entirely written. Every school champion took this test in order to qualify for the state bee. The test comprised 70 multiple choice questions, to be completed in 60 minutes. The top 100 scorers in each state or territory advanced to the state level competition. Beginning with the 2016 Bee, the Qualifying test was administered online rather than on paper.

=== State and national competitions ===
The winner of each school-level competition takes an online test, and the top 100 in each state or territory qualify for the State Bee. If there is a tie in the State Qualifying Test, all students in the tie get an invitation to the State Bee (i.e. there were 107 State Bee Qualifiers in the 2019 Michigan State Geographic Bee). The rules at the state level are same as that at the school level, except that there are eight preliminary rounds instead of seven and each player is limited to two repeats or spelling for all eight preliminary rounds. Players are also limited to two repeats or spellings in the final round if they qualify. All the state bees are held on the same date, at the same time (in early April or late March) at all locations. State bees originally occurred for the fifty states, five U.S. territories (Guam, Puerto Rico, US Virgin Islands, American Samoa, Northern Mariana Islands), Washington, D.C., and the Department of Defense Dependent Schools (DoDDS), for a total of 57. In 1999, the state competitions for Guam, American Samoa, and Northern Mariana Islands were merged into one state competition known as the Pacific Territories, bringing the number down to 55. In 2009, the Puerto Rico and US Virgin Islands competitions were merged into a single competition known as the Atlantic Territories, and since then there have only been 54 state and territory competitions. For completions that involve students spread out across wide areas, such as the competitions like the DoDDS and Pacific Territories competitions, there is no in person competition such as in other states. Instead, after winning the school bee, school champions from around these territories take a series of online tests to determine the territory champion. The third-place finisher from each state receives $100, the second-place finisher $300, and the winner $1000. The 54 state champions receive an all-expense-paid trip to Washington, D.C., for the national competition.

The rules at the national level are the same as those at the state, except that there are ten preliminary rounds instead of eight. There was previously a video part of the preliminary competition where students submitted a video worth six points, but was replaced by a written "GeoChallenge" worth ten points. The championship round can also consist of five questions instead of three. The competition is held over four days, with the preliminary rounds on the first day and the final rounds on the third. The national finals are held in late May at National Geographic Society Headquarters in Washington, D.C. and are hosted by Mo Rocca. The ten finalists are guaranteed $1000. The third-place finisher receives a $5,000 college scholarship, the second-place finisher receives a $10,000 college scholarship, and the National Champion receives a $25,000 college scholarship, as well as a lifetime membership in the National Geographic Society. From 2009 to 2015, the National Champion also won a trip to the Galápagos Islands. In 2016, this changed when National Champion Rishi Nair won a trip to southeast Alaska instead, including a stop at Glacier Bay National Park. This was because 2016 was the centenary of the U.S. National Park Service. But from 2017 onwards, this was reverted back to the Galápagos Islands which the National Champion Pranay Varada received. The National Competition final round format is also different from the state. Originally, it was the same format, but in 2012, National Geographic changed the format so that answers were displayed on a blue screen, correct answers were worth points, and competitors could earn extra points with bonus questions, with eliminations being every few rounds. In 2015, the logo of the National Geographic Bee was updated, and they changed the format once again. Instead of ten blue answer screens for the final round, now there are alternating blue and green screens. There are no longer bonus questions, and the first five rounds are USA based and worth one point for most questions. The fifth round is a “lightning round” where you are asked three rapid fire questions. Then, four students with the lowest scores are eliminated, a tie being broken with a tiebreaker about estimation. The next four rounds are global and are all worth two points per question, and end again with another lightning round. After this, the top three are left. There are two "GeoChallenges" in the final competition, one worth three points in round 3, and for the top ten a 45-second oral response worth six points. The top two then compete in a normal championship round. In 2019, however, due to the introduction of a new competition that is called the GeoChallenge (which is about developing a collaborative team project to tackle a given issue) they once again changed the format of the Bee. The semifinals, which consists of the top 10 contestants, is held on one day. There are eight rounds of oral and written questions, and the four lowest scores are eliminated after these eight rounds. Afterwards, there is a GeoChallenge worth ten points, and three contestants are eliminated to narrow the competition down to the final three. The next day, the top three contestants compete in the finals. They have a series of five oral rounds, and then they have a GeoChallenge round and a mapmaker round. Afterwards, the lowest scoring contestant is eliminated, and a normal championship round occurs to determine the champion.

=== List of moderators ===
Moderator's name	Year(s) moderated	First National Champion	Last National Champion
Alex Trebek	1989–2013	Jack Staddon	Sathwik Karnik
Soledad O'Brien	2014–2015	Akhil Rekulapelli	Karan Menon
Mo Rocca	2016–2019	Rishi Nair	Nihar Janga

=== International competition ===
There was an international competition, which was also moderated by the late Alex Trebek, but it was run differently. The top finishers from each country's national competition formed a team representing their country and participated in an Olympic-style event which included a team written competition and a team oral competition. The 2013 competition was held in Saint Petersburg, Russia. The 2015 National Geographic World Championship, originally planned to take place in Stockholm, Sweden, was canceled, and the competition since has been put on hiatus.

=== Criticism ===
Some argue that the selection process of the National Geographic GeoBee competition is not well designed to reliably promote the most qualified contestants, as it leaves significant room for chance. This is due to the small number of questions and the fact that each contestant answers different questions. Particularly, during the preliminary rounds contestants are eliminated with a single mistake if there are more than 9 perfect scores. The fact that a single mistake is not a reliable indicator for a contestant's incompetence was demonstrated during the 2014 National competition. The preliminary rounds resulted in 9 contestants with perfect score who accordingly became finalists. The 10th spot was filled by tie breaker rounds between contestants who made a single mistake during the preliminaries and went to the Virginia champion Akhil Rekulapelli, who then went on to win the finals. Again in 2019, Nihar Janga was involved in a tiebreaker to advance to the top 10, and he went on to win the entire competition. Some also argue that the GeoBee became too focused on GeoChallenge rounds instead of standard geography questions. This was demonstrated in 2019, where more than half the total points in the semifinal and final rounds were based on these open ended GeoChallenge questions. Some also criticize the gender imbalance of the GeoBee; only two girls have ever won the contest. There was also a racial imbalance which skewed National Champions Caucasian until around the mid 2000s, and every single year since 2005, either the National Champion or the runner-up was a South Asian.

== Champions ==
=== National Champions ===
Of the thirty-one National Geographic GeoBee champions, twenty-nine have been male and two were female. Five each are from the states of Texas & Washington, four are from the state of Michigan, two each from Florida, Kansas & New Jersey and various other states have been home to one champion each.

Year	Winner's Name	State	Grade	Final Question	Answer	Notes
1989	Jack Staddon	Kansas	Eighth	Name the flat intermontane area located at an elevation of about 10,000 feet (3,050 m) in the central Andes.	Altiplano	First champion First Kansas champion
1990	Susannah Batko-Yovino	Pennsylvania	Sixth	Mount Erebus is a volcano on which continent?	Antarctica	First sixth grade and female champion and youngest champion for a dozen years until 2002; First Pennsylvania champion Was second place finalist in the 1995 Jeopardy! Teen Tournament
1991	David Stillman	Idaho	Eighth	What type of landform is commonly associated with orographic precipitation?	Mountain	First Idaho champion Had a perfect score in the finals
1992	Lawson Fite	Washington	Eighth	Many coastal countries have established so-called EEZs—areas extending 200 nautical miles (370 km) from shore over which countries have sovereign rights for resource exploration. What do the initials EEZ stand for?	Exclusive Economic Zone	First Washington champion Had a perfect score in the finals
1993	Noel Erinjeri	Michigan	Eighth	Tagalog is one of the three main native languages of which island country in Asia?	The Philippines	First Michigan champion First South Asian champion Finished 4th place in 1992
1994	Anders Knospe	Montana	Eighth	The Tagus River roughly divides which European country into two agricultural regions, grain and potatoes in the north, and grapes in the south?	Portugal	First Montana champion
1995	Chris Galeczka	Michigan	Eighth	Pashtu and Dari are the official languages of which mountainous, landlocked country in southwestern Asia?	Afghanistan	Was a finalist in 1994
1996	Seyi Fayanju	New Jersey	Seventh	Name the European co-principality whose heads of state are the President of France and the Bishop of Urgell.	Andorra	First New Jersey champion Had a perfect score in the finals Presented an object in the 1994 finals as the New Jersey state champion Was a contestant on the game shows Figure It Out and Jeopardy!
1997	Alex Kerchner	Washington	Seventh	Asia's most densely populated country has about three million people and an area of less than 250 square miles (402 km^{2}). Name this country.	Singapore	Finished 4th place in 1996
1998	Petko Peev	Michigan	Eighth	More than 80 million people live in the European Union's most populous member country. Name this country.	Germany	
1999	David Beihl	South Carolina	Eighth (homeschooled)	The condition characterized by unusually cold ocean temperature in the equatorial region of the eastern Pacific Ocean is known by what Spanish name?	La Niña	First South Carolina champion First home-schooled champion Competed in 1999 Scripps National Spelling Bee championship later in the same month
2000	Felix Peng	Connecticut	Eighth	Name two of the three largest sections of Denmark, which include its mainland peninsula and two largest islands.	Jutland, Zealand and Fyn	First Connecticut champion Won after 7 tiebreaker questions in the Championship Round, the all-time record The 2nd place finisher that year, George Thampy, ended up winning the Scripps National Spelling Bee that year.
2001	Kyle Haddad-Fonda	Washington	Eighth	Below the equilibrium line of glaciers there is a region of melting, evaporation, and sublimation. Name this zone.	Zone of ablation	Rhodes Scholar; Harvard graduate Was in the finals in 1999
2002	Calvin McCarter	Michigan	Fifth (homeschooled)	Lop Nur, a marshy depression at the east end of the Tarim Basin, is a nuclear test site for which country?	China (People's Republic)	Youngest champion This year marked the first time that a competitor in the championship round caught up after falling behind. Calvin lost his one-point lead, but later regained it.
2003	James Williams	Washington	Eighth (homeschooled)	Goa, a state in southwestern India, was a possession of which country until 1961?	Portugal	Also a competitor in the National Middle School Science Bowl and National Science Olympiad.
2004	Andrew Wojtanik	Kansas	Eighth	Peshawar, a city in the North-West Frontier Province of Pakistan, has had strategic importance for centuries because of its location near what historic pass?	Khyber Pass	Wrote Afghanistan to Zimbabwe guide with important information for each country.
2005	Nathan Cornelius	Minnesota	Seventh (homeschooled)	Lake Gatún, an artificial lake that constitutes part of the Panama Canal system, was created by damming which river?	Chagres River	First Minnesota champion
2006	Bonny Jain	Illinois	Eighth	Name the mountains that extend across much of Wales, from the Irish Sea to the Bristol Channel.	Cambrian Mountains	First Illinois champion Was in the finals in 2005; Placed 13th in 2006 Scripps National Spelling Bee; Was contestant in 2009 Jeopardy! Teen Tournament
2007	Caitlin Snaring	Washington	Eighth (homeschooled)	A city that is divided by a river of the same name was the imperial capital of Vietnam for more than a century. Name this city, which is still an important cultural center.	Huế	Second female champion Had a perfect score in the finals
2008	Akshay Rajagopal	Nebraska	Sixth	The urban area of Cochabamba has been in the news recently due to protests over the privatization of the municipal water supply and regional autonomy issues. Cochabamba is the third-largest conurbation in what country?	Bolivia	Second sixth grade champion First Nebraska champion Had a perfect score in the finals Won the Bee on his first attempt at the school, state, and national level.
2009	Eric Yang	Texas	Seventh	Timis County shares its name with a tributary of the Danube and is located in the western part of which European country?	Romania	First Texas champion Had a perfect score in the finals
2010	Aadith Moorthy	Florida	Eighth	The largest city in northern Haiti was renamed following Haiti's independence from France. What is the present-day name of this city?	Cap-Haïtien	First Florida champion Won the Bee the first year he came to the National Level; Became the first person to win the bee after missing his first question in the finals Achieved a perfect SAT score in 2013 and a perfect GRE score in 2016; He was named as member of the pioneer cohort of Knight-Hennessy Scholars in 2018.
2011	Tine Valencic	Texas	Seventh	Thousands of mountain climbers and trekkers rely on Sherpas to aid their ascent of Mount Everest. The southern part of Mount Everest is located in which Nepalese national park?	Sagarmatha National Park	Had a perfect score in the finals
2012	Rahul Nagvekar	Texas	Eighth	Name the Bavarian city situated on the Danube River that was a legislative seat of the Holy Roman Empire from 1663 to 1806.	Regensburg	First time contender at the National Level Bee; Finished second place in the 2011 Texas Geographic Bee, behind Tine Valencic
2013	Sathwik Karnik	Massachusetts	Seventh	Because Earth bulges at the equator, the point that is farthest from Earth's center is the summit of a peak in Ecuador. Name this peak.	Chimborazo	First Massachusetts champion First time contender at the National Level Bee; Brother Karthik Karnik finished 5th place in 2011 and 6th place in 2012; Last champion in the Alex Trebek era
2014	Akhil Rekulapelli	Virginia	Eighth	Winning Question: Oyala, a planned city in the rainforest 65 miles east of Bata is being built as a future capital for which country? Final Question: The discovery of a major shale oil deposit in the Vaca Muerta formation in 2010 has led to an expansion of oil drilling in the Neuquén province in what country?	Equatorial Guinea Argentina	First Virginia champion Finished 4th place in 2013
2015	Karan Menon	New Jersey	Eighth	Winning Question: Mariupol, at the mouth of the Kalmius River, is a port city on which sea, an arm of the Black Sea? Final Question: If completed, the proposed Grand Inga Dam would become the world's largest hydropower plant. This dam would be built near Inga Falls on which African river?	Sea of Azov Congo River	First time contender in the National Level Bee; Karan challenged a question in the finals and came 2nd place in the 2014 New Jersey Geographic Bee
2016	Rishi Nair	Florida	Sixth	Winning Question: A new marine sanctuary will protect sharks and other wildlife around Isla Wolf in what archipelago in the Pacific Ocean? Final Question: Which East African lake that drains into the Ruzizi River contains large quantities of dissolved methane gas that could generate electricity for millions of people?	Galapagos Islands Lake Kivu	First sixth grade National Champion since Akshay Rajagopal in 2008, only the third sixth grade National Champion overall Won the 2015 Florida Geographic Bee and represented Florida at the National Finals in 2015 and 2016
2017	Pranay Varada	Texas	Eighth	What large mountain system that stretches more than 1,200 miles separates the Taklimakan Desert from the Tibetan Plateau?	Kunlun Mountains	Was two points from a perfect score in the finals Placed 6th in 2016; First time a tiebreaker was used in the championship round since 2012; First time an answer was challenged in the Championship round Published books in his Geography series including Australia and Oceania, United States of America, North America (excluding USA), South America, Africa, and Europe.
2018	Venkat Ranjan	California	Eighth	Lebanon has a population most similar to which South American country?	Paraguay	First California champion First time contender in the National Level Bee; Also participated in the finals of the National Science Bowl
2019	Nihar Janga	Texas	Eighth	One-third of Norway’s northernmost county is in what plateau?	Finnmark Plateau	Co-champion of the 89th Scripps National Spelling Bee in 2016; Placed 8th in 2018
2020	None					Cancelled due to an evolving health crisis revolving around COVID-19
2021	None					Originally planned to be held online; cancelled due to a 75% decrease in registrations

=== States by National Champions ===
State	#	Years won
Texas	5	2009, 2011, 2012, 2017, 2019
Washington	5	1992, 1997, 2001, 2003, 2007
Michigan	4	1993, 1995, 1998, 2002
Florida	2	2010, 2016
Kansas	2	1989, 2004
New Jersey	2	1996, 2015
California	1	2018
Connecticut	1	2000
Idaho	1	1991
Illinois	1	2006
Massachusetts	1	2013
Minnesota	1	2005
Montana	1	1994
Nebraska	1	2008
Pennsylvania	1	1990
South Carolina	1	1999
Virginia	1	2014

== Recent competitions ==
- 2019 competition
- 2018 competition
- 2017 competition
