= 12th National Geographic Bee =

2000 American academic competition

- Date: May 24, 2000
- Location: Washington, D.C.
- Winner: Felix Peng (13 at time of win)
- No. of contestants: 55

The 12th National Geographic Bee was held in Washington, D.C., on May 24, 2000, sponsored by the National Geographic Society. The final competition was moderated by Jeopardy! host Alex Trebek. The winner was Felix Peng of Elisabeth Adams Middle School in Guilford, Connecticut, who won a $25,000 college scholarship. The 2nd-place winner, George Thampy, of St. Louis, Missouri, won a $15,000 scholarship. The 3rd-place winner, Jonathan Janus, of Ravenel, South Carolina, won a $10,000 scholarship.

== 2000 State Champions ==
State	Winner's Name	Grade	School	City/Town	Notes
Alabama	Phillip Golladay	Spanish Fort			
Arizona	Bradley Simon	Mesa			
California	Brian A. Dumbacher	8th	Temple City	Top 10 finalist	Won the California State Bee in 1999
Colorado	Aleksandr Andreev	Littleton			
Connecticut	Felix H. Peng	8th	Elisabeth Adams Middle School	Guilford	2000 Champion
Delaware	Ramsey C. Furse	Lewes			
Department of Defense	Daniel Rudy	Germany			
District of Columbia	David Mathias				
Florida	Thomas Liguori	Cooper City	Top 10 finalist		
Georgia	Robert J. Schleifer	Gillsville			
Hawaii	Glenn Shigetomi	Honolulu			
Indiana	Jeffrey Modrowski	Crown Point			
Iowa	Conor Bresnan	Indianola	Top 10 finalist		
Kansas	Will Brubaker	Lawrence	Top 10 finalist		
Kentucky	Frank Guan	Louisville	Top 10 finalist		
Louisiana	Joe Henry (Hank) Legan	7th	Bossier City		
Maine	Nick Krakoff	Hope			
Maryland	Michael Dudkin	Silver Spring	Top 10 finalist		
Massachusetts	Matthew Moran	Belmont Hill School	North Quincy	Top 10 finalist	
Michigan	Peter Holland	Pontiac			
Missouri	George Abraham Thampy	St. Louis	Second Place		
New Hampshire	Niall Prendergast	Hanover			
New Jersey	Thomas Perkowski	Spring Lake			
New Mexico	Peter Indall	Santa Fe			
New York	Nathaniel Mattison	Armonk			
North Carolina	Anthony Curnes	Greensboro			
North Dakota	John Rice	6th	Maddock		
Ohio	Brian Asquith	Cincinnati			
Pennsylvania	Matthew Russell	Bradford			
Puerto Rico	Hila Levy	Santurce			
South Carolina	Jonathan Janus	Ravenel	Third Place		
South Dakota	Christopher Meyer	Sturgis			
Tennessee	Eric P. Brown	8th	McCallie School	Chattanooga	Won the Tennessee State Bee in 1999
Texas	Jason Ferguson	7th	Dallas		
Utah	Daniel B. Blatter	Salt Lake City			
Virginia	Steven Young	7th	Reston		
Washington	Kyle Q. Haddad-Fonda	7th	Shoreline		
West Virginia	Benjamin Bateson	Wheeling			
Wisconsin	Nick Simmons	Madison			
Wyoming	Adam Towler	Laramie			
