= 5th National Geographic Bee =

1993 American academic competition

- Date: May 26, 1993
- Location: Washington, D.C.
- Winner: Noel Erinjeri (14 at time of win)
- No. of contestants: 57

The 5th National Geographic Bee was held in Washington, D.C., on May 26, 1993, sponsored by the National Geographic Society. The final competition was moderated by Jeopardy! host Alex Trebek. The winner was Noel Erinjeri of Swartz Creek, Michigan, who won a $25,000 college scholarship. The 2nd-place winner, Michael Ring of Milford, Massachusetts, won a $15,000 scholarship. The 3rd-place winner, Jeffrey Hoppes of Lancaster, Pennsylvania, won a $10,000 scholarship.

== 1993 State Champions ==
State	Winner's Name	Grade	School	City/Town	Notes
Alabama	Will Lyndon				
Arkansas	Will Turner				
California	Jory Hecht	Top 10 finalist			
Delaware	Brijesh "Brij" Khot				
Hawaii	Scott McCord	Top 10 finalist (10th place)			
Idaho	Brendan Melander				
Illinois	Jared Mehl	Belvidere Junior High School	Belvidere		
Kentucky	Josh Taylor				
Maryland	Jeff Raedy	7th	Monocacy Middle School	Frederick	Top 10 finalist
Massachusetts					
Michigan	Noel Erinjeri	8th	Swartz Creek	1993 Champion	Won the Michigan State Bee in 1992
Mississippi	Bertrand "Bert" Thompson				
Missouri	Teresa Conan				
Montana	András "Anders" Knospe	7th	Bozeman		
New York	Michael Lapetina	6th	Loudonville School	Menands	Top 10 finalist
Northern Marianas	Marcus Lucier				
Ohio	Nathan Ostrander	Top 10 finalist			
Oklahoma	Andrew McKenzie (Back-to-back State Champion)				
Oregon	Celeste Miller				
Pennsylvania	Jeffrey Hoppes	Lancaster	Third Place		
Rhode Island	Michael Ring	Milford, Massachusetts	Second Place		
South Carolina	Jonathan Windgate				
South Dakota	Matt Konrad	Top 10 finalist			
Tennessee	Jonathan "Jon" Kinsey				
Utah	Matthew Newbold	Top 10 finalist			
U.S. Virgin Islands	A.J. Stallard				
