= 7th National Geographic Bee =

1995 American academic competition

- Date: May 31, 1995
- Location: Washington, D.C.
- Winner: Christopher Galeczka (13 at time of win)
- No. of contestants: 57

The 7th National Geographic Bee was held in Washington, D.C., on May 31, 1995, sponsored by the National Geographic Society. The final competition was moderated by Jeopardy! host Alex Trebek. The winner was Chris Galeczka of Bemis Junior High School in Sterling Heights, Michigan, who won a $25,000 college scholarship. The 2nd-place winner, Aaron Wenzel of Freeport Junior High School in Freeport, Illinois, won a $15,000 scholarship. The 3rd-place winner, Brendan Gordon, a homeschooled student from Moscow, Idaho, won a $10,000 scholarship.

== 1995 State Champions ==
State	Winner's Name	Grade	School	City/Town	Notes
Colorado	Leo Cruz	Top 10 finalist			
Florida	Ramesh Nagarajan	Top 10 finalist (6th place)			
Idaho	Brendan Gordon	8th	Moscow	Third Place	
Illinois	Aaron Wenzel	8th	Freeport Junior High School	Freeport	Second Place
Maryland	Dan Notzon	Top 10 finalist			
Michigan	Chris Galeczka	8th	Bemis Junior High School	Sterling Heights	1995 Champion
New York	Michael Lapetina	8th	Loudonville School	Menands	Top 10 finalist
Tennessee	Ned Andrews	8th	Knoxville	Top 10 finalist	Won the Tennessee State Bee in 1994
Utah	Bret Lingwall	Top 10 finalist			
West Virginia	Andrew Gompers	Top 10 finalist			
