= 11th National Geographic Bee =

1999 American academic competition

- Date: May 26, 1999
- Location: Washington, D.C.
- Winner: David Beihl (13 at time of win)
- No. of contestants: 55

The 11th National Geographic Bee was held in Washington, D.C., on May 26, 1999, sponsored by the National Geographic Society. The final competition was moderated by Jeopardy! host Alex Trebek. The winner was David Beihl, a homeschooled student from Saluda, South Carolina, who won a $25,000 college scholarship and an all-expense-paid trip to Australia. The 2nd-place winner, Jason Borschow of St. John's School in Condado, Puerto Rico, won a $15,000 scholarship. The 3rd-place winner, Tanveer Ali of Flint, Michigan, won a $10,000 scholarship.

== 1999 State Champions ==
State	Winner's Name	Grade	School	City/Town	Notes
Alabama	Matthew T. Novak	Tuscaloosa			
Alaska	David K. Dunsmore	Anchorage			
Arizona	Michael J. Fitzsimmons	Tucson			
Arkansas	Jonathan D. VerHoeven	Springdale			
California	Brian A. Dumbacher	7th	Temple City		
Colorado	Jeffrey J. Marlow	8th	Graland Country Day School	Denver	Top 10 finalist
Connecticut	Felix H. Peng	7th	Elisabeth Adams Middle School	Guilford	Top 10 finalist
Department of Defense	James Michael Halterman, Jr.				
District of Columbia	Alexandr Pshenichkin	Top 10 finalist			
Indiana	Kellie Packwood	Martinsville	Won the Indiana State Bee in 1998		
Iowa	Alex Paul Koenigs	Riceville			
Kansas	Matthew A. Speise	Kansas City			
Kentucky	James Zhang	Lexington	Top 10 finalist		
Louisiana	Mark Landreneau	Alexandria			
Maine	Gregory Thaler	Yarmouth			
Maryland	Zane G. Craig	Emmitsburg	Top 10 finalist		
Massachusetts	Kevin Dunn	Winchester			
Michigan	Tanveer Ali	8th	Flint	Third Place	
Missouri	Mallika Sarah Thampy	Maryland Heights			
New Hampshire	Jesse M. Baver	Amherst			
New Jersey	Vikram R. Modi	Ridgewood			
New Mexico	Jedediah S. Drolet	Albuquerque			
New York	Michael S. Oh	6th	Transit Middle School	East Amherst	
North Carolina	Edwin C. Smolski	Hendersonville			
North Dakota	Patrick Hope	Dickinson			
Ohio	Matthew J. Solomon	Elida	Top 10 finalist		
Puerto Rico	Jason Borschow	8th	St. John's School	Condado	Second Place
South Carolina	David Beihl	8th	Saluda	1999 Champion	
South Dakota	Eric P. Rodawig	North Sioux City			
Tennessee	Eric P. Brown	7th	McCallie School	Chattanooga	
Texas	Daniel J. Watkins	North Richland Hills			
Virginia	Timothy Carr	Luray	Won the Virginia State Bee in 1998		
Washington	Kyle Q. Haddad-Fonda	6th	Shoreline	Top 10 finalist	
West Virginia	Daniel P. Harris	St. Agnes Middle School	Charleston	Won the West Virginia State Bee in 1997	
