= 18th National Geographic Bee =

2006 American academic competition

- Date: May 24, 2006
- Location: Washington, D.C.
- Winner: Bonny Jain (12 at time of win)
- No. of contestants: 55

The 18th National Geographic Bee was held in Washington, D.C., on May 24, 2006, sponsored by the National Geographic Society. The final competition was moderated by Jeopardy! host Alex Trebek. The winner was Bonny Jain of Moline, Illinois, who won a $25,000 college scholarship and lifetime membership in the National Geographic Society. The 2nd-place winner, Neeraj Sirdeshmukh of Nashua, New Hampshire, won a $15,000 scholarship. The 3rd-place winner, Yeshwanth Kandimalla of Marietta, Georgia, won a $10,000 scholarship.

== 2006 State Champions ==
State	Winner's Name	Grade	School	City/Town	Notes
Alabama	Lowell Van Ness	8th	Bumpus Middle School	Hoover	
Alaska	Andrew Lee	7th	Interior Distance Education of Alaska	Anchorage	
Arizona	Kelsey Schilperoort	8th	Heritage Christian Home Educators	Prescott	Top 10 finalist
Arkansas	Devin Matthews	6th	Lake Area Homeschool Association	Drasco	
California	Ryland Lu	8th	Pressman Academy	Los Angeles	
Colorado	Autumn Hughes	6th	Homeschooled	Wheat Ridge	Top 10 finalist
Connecticut	Liam McCarthy	8th	Middlesex Middle School	Darien	
Delaware	Matthew Heitmann	8th	Gunning Bedford Middle School	New Castle	
Department of Defense	Husain Mogri	8th	Bahrain School	Bahrain	
District of Columbia	Benjamin Geyer	6th	British School of Washington	Washington, D.C.	
Florida	John Kim	7th	Oslo Middle School	Vero Beach	
Georgia	Yeshwanth Kandimalla	8th	Simpson Middle School	Marietta	Third place
Hawaii	Guthrie Angeles	6th	Kaleiopuu Elementary School	Waipahu	
Idaho	Ryan Bovard	7th	Jennifer Junior High School	Lewiston	
Illinois	Bonny Jain	8th	Woodrow Wilson Middle School	Moline	2006 champion
Indiana	Jonathan Hielkema	7th	Highland Christian School	Highland	
Iowa	Drew Coffin	8th	Northwest Junior High School	Coralville	Top 10 finalist
Kansas	Suneil Iyer	6th	Havencroft Elementary School	Olathe	Top 10 finalist
Kentucky	Matt Hensley	8th	Beaumont Middle School	Lexington	
Louisiana	Lee Winkler	5th	Kehoe-France School	Metairie	
Maine	Alexander Homer	8th	Ellsworth Middle School	Ellsworth	
Maryland	James Plamondon	8th	St. John Regional Catholic School	Frederick	
Massachusetts	Krishnan Chandra	8th	West Middle School	Andover	Top 10 finalist
Michigan	Matthew Vengalil	8th	Parcells Middle School	Grosse Pointe Woods	Top 10 finalist
Minnesota	Simon Smedberg	8th	Jefferson Community School	Minneapolis	
Mississippi	Taide Ding	5th	Central Elementary School	Oxford	
Missouri	Christopher Winston	7th	Crestview Middle School	Ellisville	
Montana	Hannah Goodman	7th	Helena Area Christian Home Educators	Helena	
Nebraska	Preston Bradley	8th	Lux Middle School	Lincoln	
Nevada	Paige dePolo	7th	Little Flower School	Reno	Top 10 finalist
New Hampshire	Neeraj Sirdeshmukh	8th	Fairgrounds Middle School	Nashua	Second Place
New Jersey	Evan Meltzer	8th	Central Middle School	Stirling	
New Mexico	Luis Baca	6th	Albuquerque Academy	Albuquerque	
New York	Jonathan Katz	8th	Scarsdale Middle School	Scarsdale	
North Carolina	Michael Narup	8th	Myrtle Grove Middle School	Wilmington	
North Dakota	Conrad Eggers	8th	Horizon Middle School	Bismarck	
Ohio	Nirbhay Jain	7th	Ottawa Hills Junior High School	Toledo	
Oklahoma	Anthony Gonzalez	8th	Centennial Middle School	Broken Arrow	
Oregon	Michael Ling	6th	Meadow Park Middle School	Beaverton	
Pacific Territories	Ian Farley	7th	South Pacific Academy	Pago Pago	
Pennsylvania	Michael Luo	8th	Eagle View Middle School	Mechanicsburg	
Puerto Rico	Francisco Vargas	7th	St. John's School	San Juan	
Rhode Island	Laura Kulm	8th	Archie Cole Middle School	East Greenwich	
South Carolina	Andrew Brill	8th	Anderson County Homeschoolers	Anderson	
South Dakota	Joseph Knofczynski	6th	Georgia Morse Middle School	Pierre	
Tennessee	Mark Arildsen	6th	University School of Nashville	Nashville	
Texas	Jiawei Li	7th	Beck Junior High	Katy	
Utah	Jeffrey Bennett	8th	Midvale Middle School	Midvale	
Vermont	Lucas Earl	8th	Randolph Union Jr./Sr. High School	Randolph	
Virginia	José Antonio de la Peña	7th	Families in Support of Home Education	Burke	
Virgin Islands	Sean Marin	8th	St. Croix Country Day School	St. Croix	
Washington	Caitlin Snaring	7th	Family Learning Center	Redmond	
West Virginia	Joshua Hamrick	8th	Webster Springs Middle School	Webster Springs	
Wisconsin	Oliver Buchino	8th	Marshall Middle School	Marshall	
Wyoming	James Mothersbaugh	6th	Park Elementary School	Casper	
