= 13th National Geographic Bee =

2001 American academic competition

- Date: May 23, 2001
- Location: Washington, D.C.
- Winner: Kyle Haddad-Fonda (14 at time of win)
- No. of contestants: 55

The 13th National Geographic Bee was held in Washington, D.C., on May 23, 2001, sponsored by the National Geographic Society. The final competition was moderated by Jeopardy! host Alex Trebek. The winner was Kyle Haddad-Fonda of Shoreline, Washington, who won a $25,000 college scholarship and lifetime membership in the National Geographic Society. The 2nd-place winner, Nick Jachowski of Makawao, Hawaii, won a $15,000 scholarship. The 3rd-place winner, Jason Ferguson of Dallas, Texas, won a $10,000 scholarship.

== 2001 State Champions ==
State	Winner's Name	Grade	School	City/Town	Notes	
Alaska	Rachel Schuerger	8th				
Arizona	Paul Ruffner	8th	Prescott	Top 10 finalist		
Arkansas	Kyle Macfarlan	8th	Siloam Springs Middle School	Siloam Springs	Top 10 finalist	
California	Fedor Manin	8th	J. L. Stanford Middle School	Palo Alto	Top 10 finalist	
Department of Defense	Ryan J. Felix	7th				
Georgia	Robert McRae	Barnesville	Top 10 finalist			
Hawaii	Nick Jachowski	8th	Samuel Enoka Kalama Intermediate School	Makawao	Second Place	
Indiana	Erik Bolt	8th				
Kansas	Benjamin S. Detrixhe	4th	Ames Elementary School	Ames		
Louisiana	Joe Henry (Hank) Legan	8th	Bossier City	Top 10 finalist	Won the Louisiana State Bee in 2000	
Massachusetts	Jay Ben Markson	6th	George R. Austin Middle School	Lakeville		
Michigan	Calvin McCarter	4th	Jenison			
Nevada	Jim Hoffman	8th	Helen C. Cannon Junior High School	Las Vegas	Top 10 finalist	
New York	Michael S. Oh	8th	Transit Middle School	East Amherst	Top 10 finalist	Won the New York State Bee in 1999
North Dakota	John Rice	7th	Maddock	Won the North Dakota State Bee in 2000		
Texas	Jason Ferguson	8th	Dallas	Third Place	Won the Texas State Bee in 2000	
Virginia	Steven Young	8th	Reston	Won the Virginia State Bee in 2000		
Washington	Kyle Haddad-Fonda	8th	The Evergreen School	Shoreline	2001 Champion	Won the Washington State Bee in 2000
