= Westminster Academy (Tennessee) =

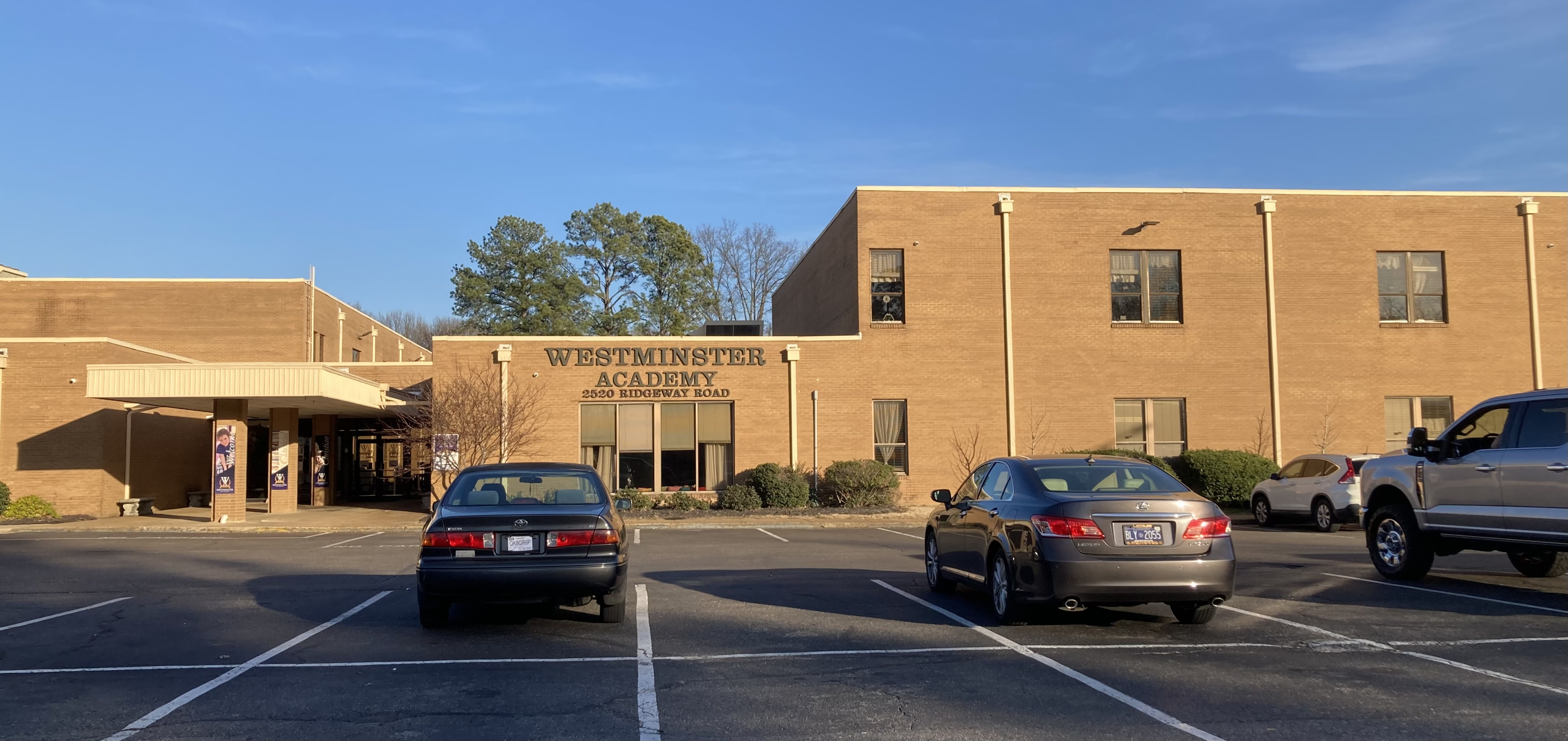
- Westminster Academy's campus in 2025

Location
- 2520 Ridgeway Road; Memphis, Tennessee; United States; 35.081°N 89.858°WWestminster Academy (Tennessee)

Information
- Type: Classical and Christian
- Motto: Jesu defendi
- Established: 1996
- Head of school: Preston Atwood
- Grades: JK–12
- Enrollment: 467
- Colors: Purple and gold
- Nickname: Defenders
- Accreditation: Association of Classical Christian Schools (ACCS), Society for Classical Learning (SCL)
- Publication: Legend
- Newspaper: The Beacon
- Yearbook: Excelsior
- Website: www.wamemphis.com

Westminster Academy is a private, classical Christian school. It was established in 1996 as Memphis’ only JK-12th grade classical Christian school. The school aims to teach children to reason, discern, and apply truth by way of Scripture.

The school is a top workplace amongst small businesses in the Memphis area.

The school offers a variety of sporting activities including cross country (2022 State Champions), soccer, tennis, basketball for both boys and girls., and track & field.
