= Marianas Baptist Academy =

Location
- Saipan; Northern Mariana Islands
- Coordinates: 15.151771°N 145.730795°E

Information
- Website: marianasbaptistacademy.blogspot.com

Marianas Baptist Academy is a private Baptist Christian school in Dandan, Saipan, Northern Mariana Islands. It serves grades 7 to 12. It was established in 1984.
