= Hot Springs School District (Arkansas) =

School district in Arkansas

Location
- 400 Linwood Ave; Hot Springs, Arkansas 71913 United States

District information
- Grades: PK–12
- Accreditation: ADE
- Schools: 8
- NCES District ID: 0507890

Students and staff
- Students: 3,718
- Teachers: 276.35 (on FTE basis)
- Staff: 582.35 (on FTE basis)
- Student–teacher ratio: 13.45

Other information
- Website: www.hssd.net

Hot Springs School District is a public school district based in Hot Springs, Arkansas, United States. The Hot Springs School District encompasses 33.15 square miles (85.9 km^{2}) of land in Garland County, including the vast majority of Hot Springs, as well as sections of Hot Springs National Park.

The school district provides early childhood, elementary and secondary education for more than 3,700 prekindergarten through grade 12 at its eight schools, which are accredited by the Arkansas Department of Education (ADE).

== Schools ==
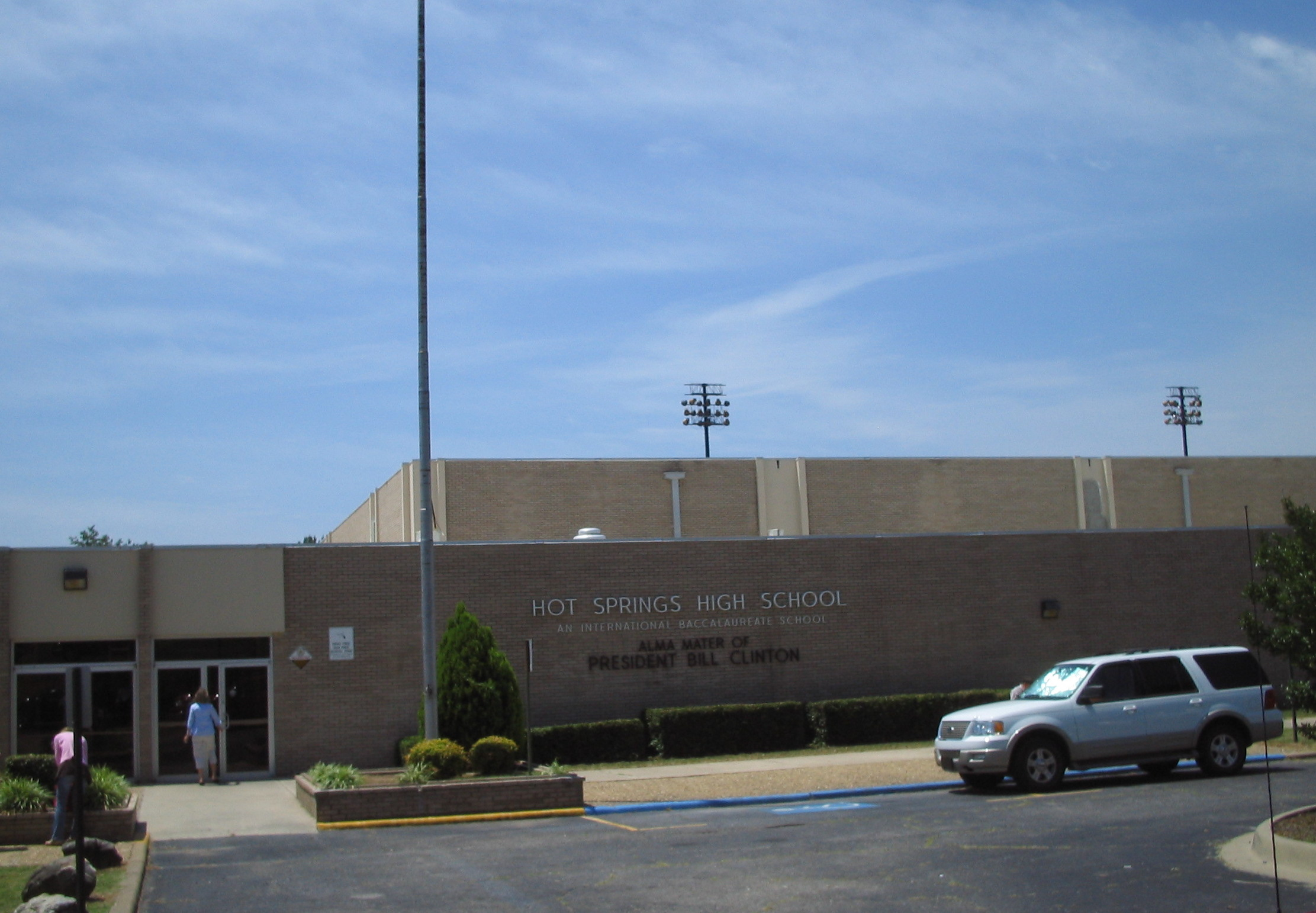
Hot Springs High School

Secondary education

- Hot Springs High School—IB Diploma Programme (IB DP World School) grades 9 through 12.
- Hot Springs Middle School—IB Middle Years Programme (IB MYP World School) grades 7 and 8.
- Hot Springs Intermediate School—IB Middle Years Programme (IB MYP World School) grades 5 and 6.

Ełementary education

- Gardner Magnet School—kindergarten through grade 4; serves as a Math, Science & Technology magnet school.
- Langston Magnet School—prekindergarten through grade 4; serves as an Aerospace & Environmental magnet school.
- Oaklawn Magnet School—kindergarten through grade 4; serves as a Visual & Performing Arts magnet school.
- Park Magnet School—IB Primary Years Programme (IB PYP World School) kindergarten through grade 4. Park Magnet School has received numerous accolades including:

- 2009 National Blue Ribbon School by the U.S. Department of Education (ED).
- 2011 High Performance Exemplary School by the Arkansas Department of Education (ADE).
- 2012 Arkansas High Performing School by the National Center of Educational Achievement (NCEA), a department of ACT, Inc.

=== Alternate education ===
- Summit School—kindergarten through grade 12.
