= Benny's =

Defunct discount store in southern New England, US

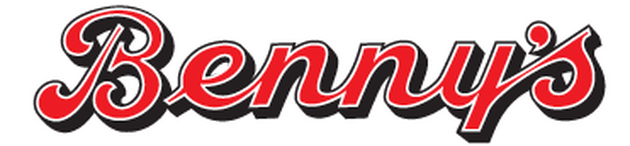

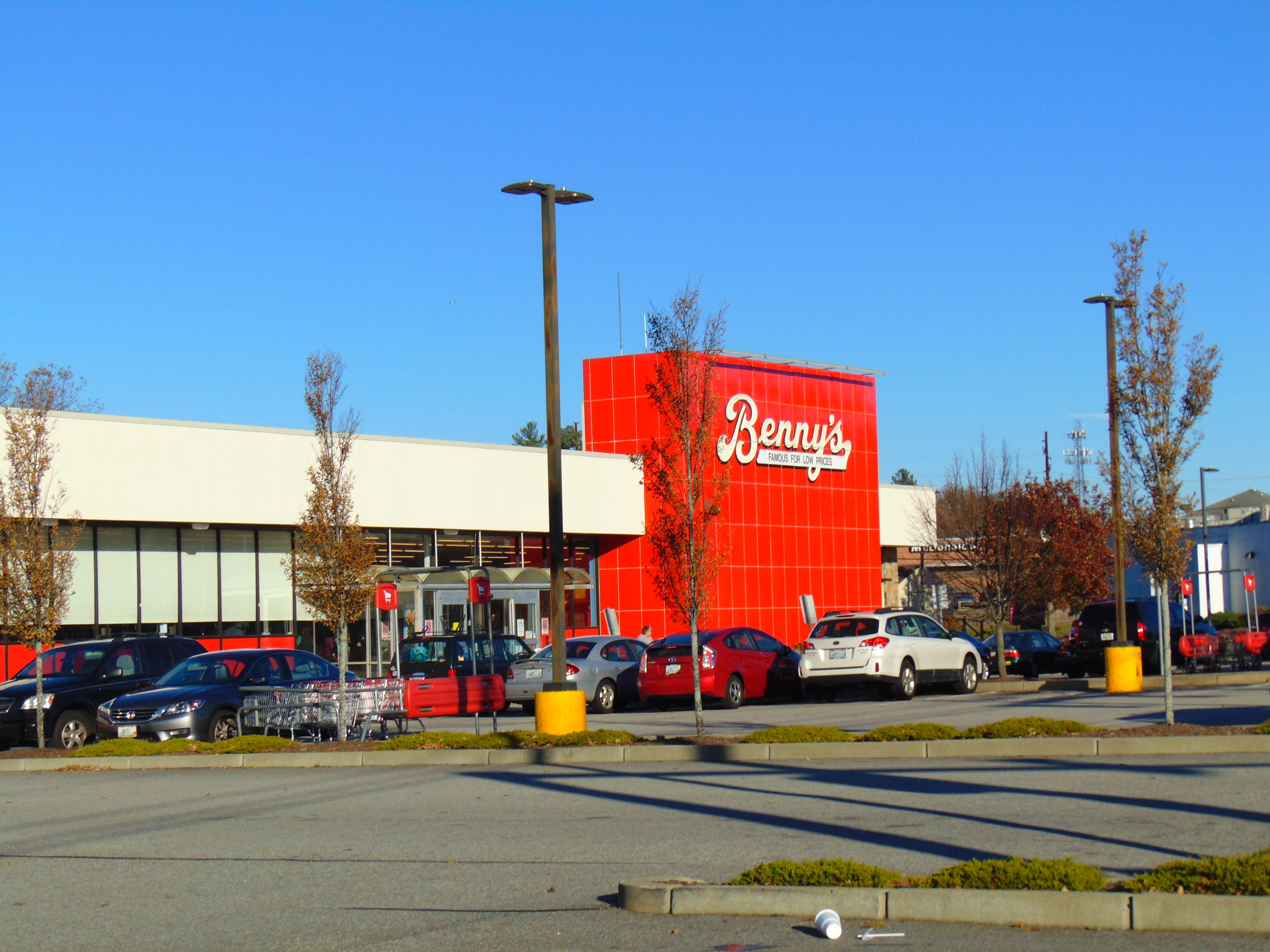
- The Greenville location in November 2017.
- Company type: Store
- Industry: Discount retail
- Founded: November 9, 1924, Providence, Rhode Island
- Founder: Benjamin Bromberg
- Defunct: December 11, 2017
- Fate: Closed permanently as a result of a business decision
- Headquarters: Esmond, Smithfield, Rhode Island
- Number of locations: 31 (September 8, 2017)
- Area served: Rhode Island, Massachusetts, Connecticut
- Owner: Arnold Bromberg; Howard Bromberg; Judy Rosenstein
- Number of employees: 715 (September 8, 2017)
- Website: Official Website at the Wayback Machine (archived December 10, 2017)

Benny's was a New England–based discount retail chain founded in 1924 in Providence, Rhode Island, and having operated in Rhode Island, Massachusetts, and Connecticut. The main company offices were located in Esmond, Smithfield, Rhode Island. On September 8, 2017, the company announced that it would be closing all 31 of its operating locations, and its last location in Greenville, Smithfield, Rhode Island, closed permanently on December 11, 2017.

== History ==
Benjamin Bromberg (1901–1966) was born in Russia to Max and Zlata (Fishman) Bromberg. Bromberg immigrated to the United States in 1910, settling in Providence, Rhode Island. His wife, Flora (Wolfe) Bromberg (1901–1991), was born in Baltimore, Maryland, to Moses and Anna Wolfe and was one of the first graduates of Bryant & Stratton Business School. Prior to opening Benny's, Bromberg worked for the American Auto Supply Company as a manager. Benjamin Bromberg founded Benny's Auto Store on November 9, 1924, in Providence. In 1929, a second store was opened in East Providence, Rhode Island, and in 1931, Benny's opened its first Massachusetts store in Taunton. The Providence Journal building exists on the site of the first Benny's store. In 1965, the Esmond Mill became the corporate headquarters for Benny's. After Benjamin Bromberg's death in 1966, he was succeeded as company president by his son Malcolm Bromberg. In 1968, a fire burned down the store located in East Greenwich, Rhode Island. Throughout the 1960s to the 1970s, Benny's began to expand further into Massachusetts and Connecticut, with stores opening as far as Cape Cod. The last store to open was in 2005 in Killingly, Connecticut. Malcolm Bromberg was succeeded by his children—Arnold and Howard Bromberg, and Judy Rosenstein—as the company owners following his death in 2014.

== Closure ==
On September 8, 2017, Benny's announced that it would be closing all 31 stores. This stirred minor controversy among its employees, as a portion of them found out by indirect means such as social media and claimed that they received no formal notice from corporate. The oldest store at the time of the company's closure was located on Park Avenue in Cranston, Rhode Island, having been operating since 1938. The final Benny's store, located in Greenville, Rhode Island, closed on December 11, 2017. Twenty-nine of the 31 Benny's store locations were purchased by the Carpionato Group, a development company based in Johnston, Rhode Island. Following the final store's closure, the company faced minor controversy regarding a lack of severance pay for its former employees.

Since the company's closure, several former store locations have fallen into disrepair. The roof collapsed on the former Benny's in East Wareham, Massachusetts, in January 2018. In May 2018, a fire broke out at one of the former Benny's in Seekonk, Massachusetts. Some of the former stores were sold by the Carpionato Group to other retail chains, including Dollar General, Ollie’s Bargain Outlet, and Ocean State Job Lot.

An auction was held at the Benny's corporate offices in June 2018. Store-use machinery, shelving units, delivery trucks, and returned defective merchandise were among the items auctioned.

== Legacy ==
The announcement of the company's closure shocked many customers, as Benny's was considered a southern New England icon. As a near century-old local retail store, customers shared their nostalgia for the store online. Local businesses expressed their condolences for Benny's closure.

A musical titled Benny's: The Musical was produced in tribute to the defunct company and was performed in Providence in March and May 2018.

Benny's was used as a film location in Labor Day and The Polka King.

== Locations ==
During its 93-year period of operations, Benny's had stores in the following locations:

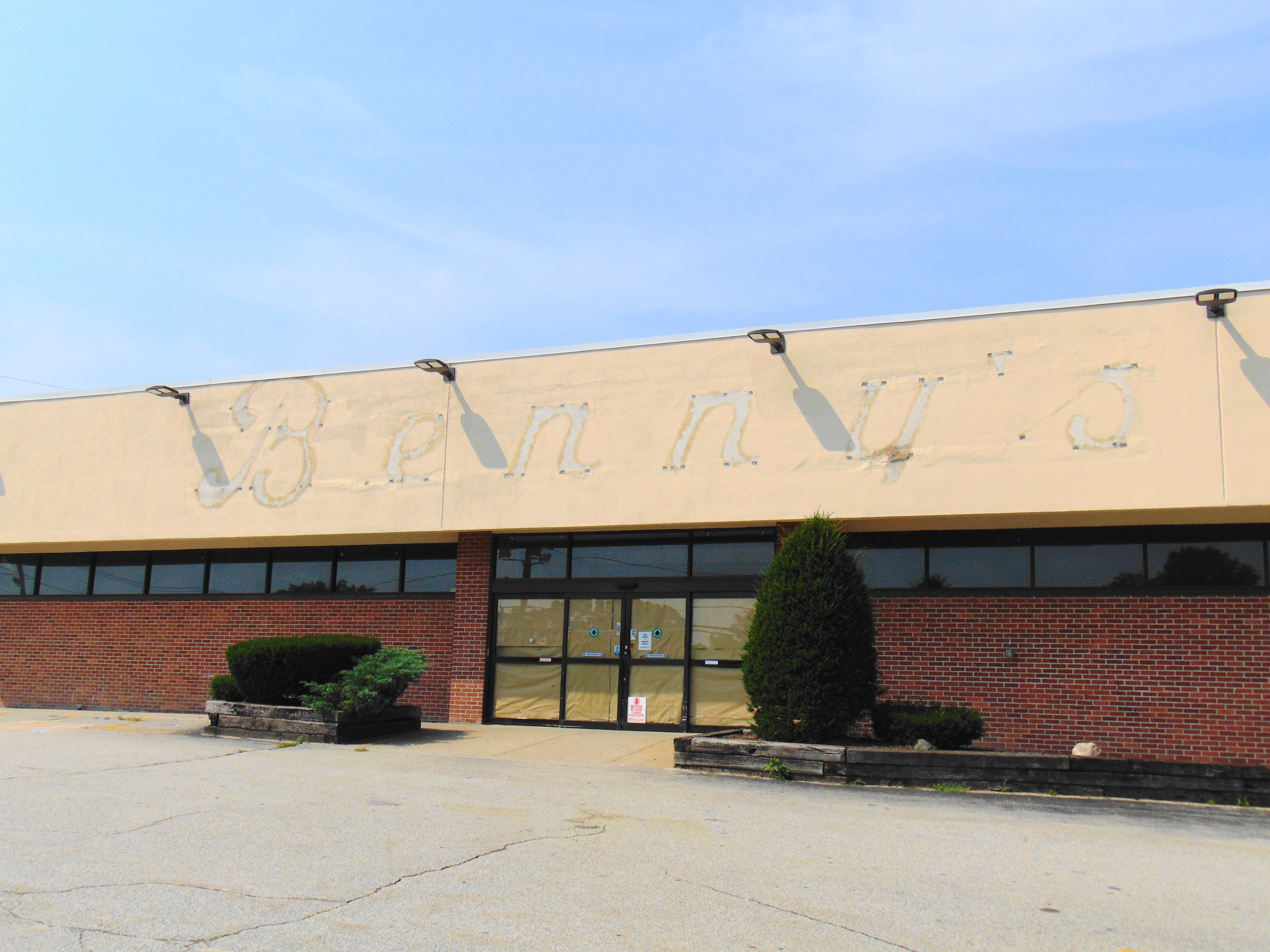
The former location in Wakefield.

=== Rhode Island ===
- Arctic (Closed in 1977)
- Bristol
- Coventry
- Cranston (Two locations: 148 Atwood Avenue & 819 Park Avenue)
- Cumberland (Closed in 2005)
- East Greenwich
- East Providence
- Greenville (Closed in 2017)
- Middletown
- Providence
- Wakefield
- Warwick (Two locations [at the time of closings]: 1109 Warwick Avenue & 2574 West Shore Road)
- Westerly

=== Massachusetts ===
- Dennisport
- East Wareham
- Fairhaven
- Fall River
- Mansfield
- Middleboro
- North Attleboro
- Plymouth
- Raynham
- Seekonk
- South Dartmouth
- Taunton (Opened in 1962)

=== Connecticut ===
- Danielson
- Groton
- South Killingly
- New London (Closed in 1980s)
- Norwichtown
- Old Saybrook
- Putnam (Closed in 1980s)
- Waterford (Closed in February 2017)
- Willimantic (Closed in 2007)

== See also ==
- Ocean State Job Lot – Another similar but larger Rhode Island–based discount retail chain.
- Ollie’s Bargain Outlet – A similar but significantly larger Pennsylvania-based discount retail chain.
- Tuesday Morning – One of the original and largest discount retail chains in the United States.
- Building 19 – A similar Massachusetts-based discount retail chain in New England, also now defunct.
