= Spags =

Spags may refer to:

- Spag's, a former discount department store in Massachusetts, US
- Steve Spagnuolo, an American football coach nicknamed "Spags"
