= Ocean State Job Lot =

American discount store chain

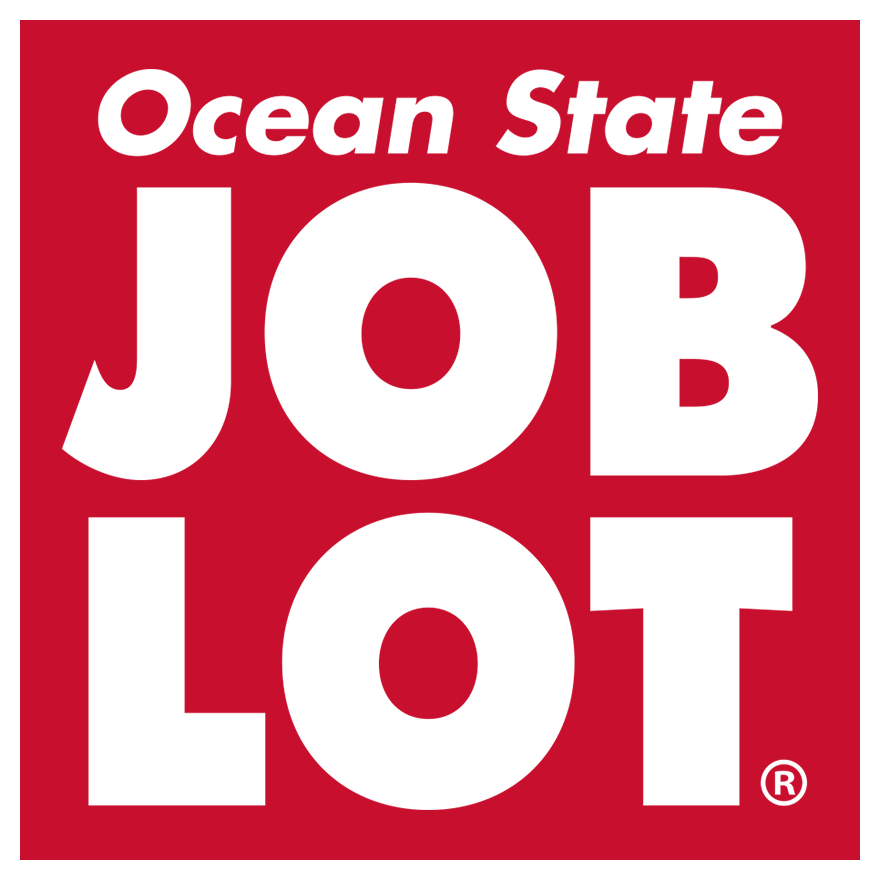

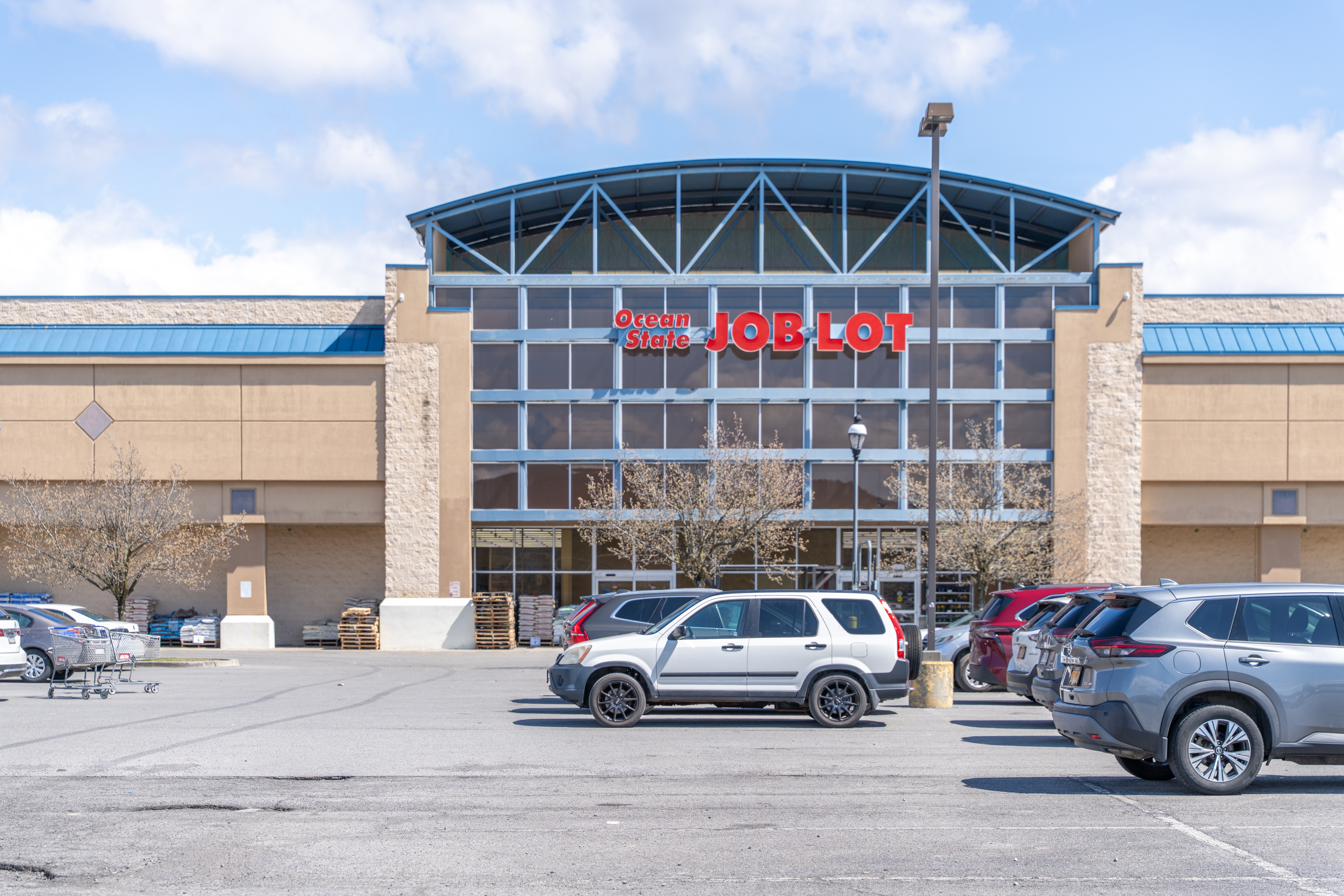
- Store in Poughkeepsie, New York
- Type: Private
- Industry: Discount retail
- Founded: 1977
- Founder: Marc Perlman, Alan Perlman, Roy Dubs
- Headquarters: North Kingstown, Rhode Island
- Number of locations: 161
- Area served: New England, New York, New Jersey, Maine, Pennsylvania, and Delaware
- Key people: Marc Perlman, Alan Perlman, Steve Aronow
- Products: Gifts, Housewares, Food, Flooring, Books, Toys, Hardware, Electronics, Clothing, Lawn and Garden, Health and Beauty, Sporting Goods, Pet Supplies, Automotive, Seasonal
- Brands: Various
- Revenue: $700M
- Owner: Ocean State Jobbers, Inc.
- Number of employees: 5,600
- Subsidiaries: Unknown restaurants
- Website: oceanstatejoblot.com

Ocean State Job Lot (abbreviation: OSJL or simply Job Lot) is a northeastern American chain of discount closeout retailers founded in Rhode Island in 1977. In addition to its origin state, it operates stores throughout the Northeastern United States, including Connecticut, Massachusetts, Pennsylvania, New Hampshire, Vermont, Maine, New York, and New Jersey. The company is headquartered in North Kingstown, Rhode Island.

== Etymology ==
The name of the company derives from Rhode Island's nickname, "The Ocean State", and from "Job Lot", which means a miscellaneous group of articles.

== Description ==
Founded by Marc Perlman, Alan Perlman, and Roy Dubs in 1977 as a single store, it currently operates 175 stores in the US and has more than 5,600 associates. Its selection of merchandise comprises a variety of discounted household goods, apparel, pet supplies, kitchen pantry staples, and seasonal products (holiday, gardening, patio, pool and beach supplies); a majority of these items are unsold and/or excess merchandise purchased in bulk from other retailers such as Walmart, Publix, or Target that are then sold at deeply discounted prices.

Ocean State Job Lot was founded in 1977 in North Kingstown, Rhode Island, by Marc Perlman, Alan Perlman, and Roy Dubs. After Ames went bankrupt in 2002, Ocean State Job Lot expanded by buying many of its former locations in New England. In 2017, 2018, and 2020, the company was on the Forbes's list of “America's Best Midsize Employers”. In 2017, the company completed a 500,000-square-foot (46,000 m^{2}) expansion of its warehouse in North Kingstown, making it the building with the largest footprint in Rhode Island with a total of 1,250,000 square feet (116,000 m^{2}). As of 2018, the company generated nearly $700 million in annual sales. Most recently in 2019, the company expanded into Pennsylvania by acquiring former Toys "R" Us locations.

== Operations and business model ==
Ocean State Job Lot is a family-run privately-held business with its corporate headquarters and distribution center in North Kingstown, RI at Quonset Point. During its expansion, the company has revitalized numerous commercial spaces and shopping plazas throughout the Northeast by acquiring vacant properties once occupied by other retailers. OSJL's business model involves purchasing merchandise directly from manufacturers and other retailers such Walmart/Sam's Club, Publix, Winn-Dixie, Kroger, Costco, Whole Foods Market, TJX-owned stores, and Target in bulk and selling in smaller quantities to customers with the minimum operational and distribution costs. The merchandise selection consists of a variety of manufacturer's overruns, overstocks and packaging changes, as well as selected other products. The company is especially focused on buying and selling closeouts. It is also affiliated with the import and distribution company Yankee Trader, LLC.

== OSJL Charitable Foundation ==
The Ocean State Job Lot Charitable Foundation was founded in 2004. Through the charity, the company claims to support a number of philanthropic causes including Israel, feeding the hungry, helping the homeless, assisting veterans and military families, aiding animal rescue, caring for children, advancing healthcare, supporting the arts, and promoting learning and sport activity in the local communities.

== See also ==
- Benny's – A historical Rhode Island–based discount retail chain, now defunct.
- Building 19 – An earlier Massachusetts-based discount closeout retailer, now defunct.
- Ollie's Bargain Outlet – A Pennsylvania-based chain of discount closeout retailers with a nearly identical business model to that of OSJL.
- Tuesday Morning – A Texas-based chain known as one of the original American discount closeout retailers; it operates with a similar business model to that of OSJL. Now defunct.
- Marden's - A Maine-based chain of discount closeout retailers.
