= Daniel R. Scoggin =

American businessman

Dan R. Scoggin
- Education: San Jose State University
- Occupation: Businessman
- Years active: 1960–1986; 1991–2000
- Employer(s): Boise Cascade Corporation; Ground Round/Gold Fork
- Known for: expanding casual-theme restaurant industry T.G.I. Friday's

Dan Scoggin (born July 18, 1937) is an American businessman and the person credited for expanding nationwide the first casual-theme restaurant, T.G.I. Friday's.

== Biography ==
Born July 18, 1937, Scoggin graduated from San Jose State University and began his career in 1960 with Boise Cascade. Boise Cascade promoted him to District Sales Manager in 1963, Plant Manager in 1964 and General Manager in 1965. By 1967, he was the Southern Area Manager in charge of half of Boise Cascade's box production for the U.S. After leaving Boise Cascade in 1971, he licensed the T.G.I. Friday's name from Alan Stillman, founder of Smith & Wollensky, opening a franchise corporation based in Dallas. The first restaurant was located on Greenville Avenue in Dallas and heralded in the Singles Era and casual dining theme restaurant industry. Scoggin took the company public in 1983. By 1986, there were 103 U.S. locations (with 20 under construction), one international location licensed to Whitbread (Birmingham, England) as well as 27 Dalt's restaurants. Scoggin retired in 1986 to sail the oceans with his family.

After returning from sailing and having been on the board since 1991, Scoggin was named president of Ground Round/Gold Fork in 1995. Ground Round/Gold Fork saw a stabilization of the company's identity and menu enhancements from a 60-item menu to a 200-item menu. Highlights of the Ground Round turnaround included enhanced employee training, improved management-employee communications, increased margins from 12% to 20% profit, doubled restaurant productivity and reduced the company's debt by $30M. Five new Gold Fork restaurants were created, and sales increased from $5,000 per week to $50,000 per week at a single location.

In 1998, a venture capital group led by Scoggin purchased Houlihan's Restaurant Group. The Houlihan's Restaurant Group includes: Devon's Seafood Grill, Darryl's and J. Gilbert's Wood-Fired Steaks & Seafood. These new restaurant concepts developed by Scoggin are still doing well today. Scoggin retired in 2000.

== Legacy ==
The business side at Friday's grew with the systems and controls like those used at Boise Cascade Corporation which enabled Scoggin to increase Friday's bottom line from 9% to 30% within a year of their implementation. The systems, philosophies and theories developed at Friday's became industry standards. Managers trained at Friday's became the most sought after in the industry and were often paid bonuses for bringing Friday's training manuals to the competition. The innovations developed by Scoggin and T.G.I.Friday's, Inc. are used in many types of industries today. As the industry innovator, Friday's was noted for leading customer trends: the creation of potato skins, blended and frozen drinks (Smoothies and Flings), summer menus, a non-alcoholic menu as well as expanding regional cuisines across the nation. Later as drinking moderated in the United States, Friday's led the casual theme industry towards high-end cognacs and wines in an effort to educate the consumer through drinking less, but drinking better. Adding flair bartending became so popular it led to the Bartender Olympics that is a worldwide event even today. The film Cocktail, starring Tom Cruise, was based on Friday's bartender flair. The legendary "Magic" Mike Werner and Jimmy Skeadas having been schooled in Friday's method of bartending, went on to create ShowTenders the international bartender training college. One of the most memorable beverage promotions done by Friday's edged FedEx into the international shipping business by participating in the great worldwide delivery race of Beaujolais Nouveau. Friday's was the winner of the American race by arriving earliest in the States with a FedEx DC-10 fully loaded with the wine.

Although advertising was never rarely an expense at Friday's, Scoggin was not averse to free advertising. At their first anniversary celebration, Scoggin sold all menu items at 10% of their current price, emulating 1965 prices. This stunt created local traffic jams and was covered by newspapers around the country. In another stunt, due to the obscure location of the Phoenix restaurant location, Scoggin contracted the tallest crane in Arizona, and raised a cutout hand with a finger pointing straight down to the restaurant. While generating newspaper coverage and customer traffic, Scoggin received a citation for the sign violation.
