= Spag's =

Department store in Shrewsbury, Massachusetts, USA

Coordinates: 42.27518°N 71.74593°W

Spag's Supply, Inc.
- Industry: Discount retail
- Founded: 1934
- Defunct: October 3, 2004
- Fate: Closed
- Headquarters: 193 Boston Turnpike; Shrewsbury, MA 01545
- Parent: Building 19 (2002-2004)

Spag's was a discount department store on Route 9 in Shrewsbury, Massachusetts. The store was considered an early pioneer of discount retailing and was notable for its longtime resistance to accepting charge cards (until 1992), offering plastic shopping bags (late 1996), and shopping carts (introduced in 1998). Due to the store’s iconic status in Central Massachusetts culture, “spags” has come to be used in the Central Mass regional dialect as slang for “assorted goods that were obtained at very reasonable prices”, in a manner similar to how a “whiz” in the Westborough dialect refers to hobby stores that utilize their backroom to host tabletop role-playing game tournaments and how “tupperware” colloquially refers to any plastic food container with a lid and sometimes even glass food containers, regardless of brand.

== History ==
Anthony "Spag" Borgatti (1916–1996) opened Shrewsbury Battery and Tire Service in 1934. In 1939, the store expanded and the name was changed to Spag's Hardware Supply. Spag's was a local sponsor of the broadcast of The New Yankee Workshop and The Victory Garden on PBS local station WGBH.

Spags was known for its motto - "No Bags At Spags" - The buyer brought their own or hand carried out the purchased items.

A second Spag's store operated from late 1999 until the end of 2001 in Springfield, Massachusetts.

When Spag died in 1996, his daughters took over until 2002, when they sold it to Building 19. The location became Spag's 19, but in September 2004 Building 19 owner Jerry Ellis said the store was not profitable in its current format. Spag's merchandise and operations were converted to Building 19's format. October 3, 2004 was the last day of business for Spag's. For much of its lifecycle, the roof of the main building had the name "SPAGS" written across the east roof, but this was painted over in 2005. Other businesses surrounding Spag's, including The Ground Round family-style restaurant, have since closed due to lack of business. In June 2007, tentative plans were announced to close Building 19 and demolish the structure to make way for an affordable housing project.

On January 11, 2016, demolition began on the former Spag's buildings. They were to be replaced with 250 apartments, 13 townhouse units, and 80,000 square feet (7,400 m^{2}) of retail space anchored by a 50,000-square-foot (4,600 m^{2}) Whole Foods Market.

== Tributes ==
On June 28, 2012, the ILS-29 Instrument Approach Procedure into Worcester Regional Airport was changed to honor contributions made by Spag and Olive Borgatti to aviation in Worcester. The "Initial Approach Fix", located just south of the store location, has been renamed from PUMPP to SPAGS.

== Corporate culture ==
=== The campus ===
Spag's was originally one central building, later named "the warehouse" when the store opened the Spag's Sports Shop—featuring sports, hunting, and fishing equipment—and the Spag's Olde School House, which contained household tools and items such as pencils, nursing wear, and photography accessories. The Olde School House was closed for storage after being sold to Building 19 but was reopened for a short while in 2003, before being closed permanently. The Sports Shop closed in 2004 after the store officially became Building 19. The only remaining building, other than the main building (which saw renovations in the mid 1990s), is the Garden Shop, which sits adjacent to the main building.

=== Closed on Sundays ===
Reflecting the Borgatti family's religious values, the store was not open on Sunday. This policy changed on November 1, 1992.

=== Cash only ===
A key to the success of the original operation was Spag's use of cash. The store did not accept credit cards, and Mr. Borgatti was able to purchase truckloads of inventory at low prices by offering immediate payment in cash. Much of the inventory was stored in the delivery trailers, parked on the Spag's lot.

== Shopper culture ==
The term "Spag's mentality" was coined to describe the thrifty mindset found among the store's customers. Depending on the context it is used in, it can carry a positive or negative connotation. One example of the Spag's mentality is the sheer number of shoppers that would visit for the store's annual spring tomato seedling giveaway. Beginning in 1957, the store would give 25 tomato seedlings to visitors; in 1985, the store gave away one million seedlings. The prices of many goods at Spag's were written on them in indelible black Magic Marker, and another aspect of the Spag's mentality was to display the handwritten price proudly, as proof of one's resourcefulness as a shopper.

=== Brand loyalty ===
Spag's often carried only one or two brands of a particular product, and, because of the store's popularity in New England and central Massachusetts, brands that are not market leaders in other areas of the country became household brands in the Spag's districts. Such is the case with Ban Deodorant and Good as Gold Coffee.

== Corporate affairs ==
=== Corporate structure ===
With the creation of Spag's Supply, Inc, in 1966, "Mrs. Spag" Olive Borgatti became president of the company, Spag the treasurer. She served as the company's president until her death in 1990. Spag assumed the position of president briefly before retiring the position to his daughter, Carol Borgatti Cullen, who served as the company president until shortly before the store's sale to Building 19. The other Borgatti daughters, Jean M. Borgatti and Sandra Borgatti Travinski, also served in upper management positions for Spag's.

== In popular culture ==
In an early scene in the movie The Place Beyond the Pines, the character played by Ryan Gosling is wearing a Spag's T-shirt, inside out. Below the name is a picture of Anthony "Spag" Borgatti wearing his signature cowboy hat.
