= Allenville Mill Storehouse =

- U.S. National Register of Historic Places
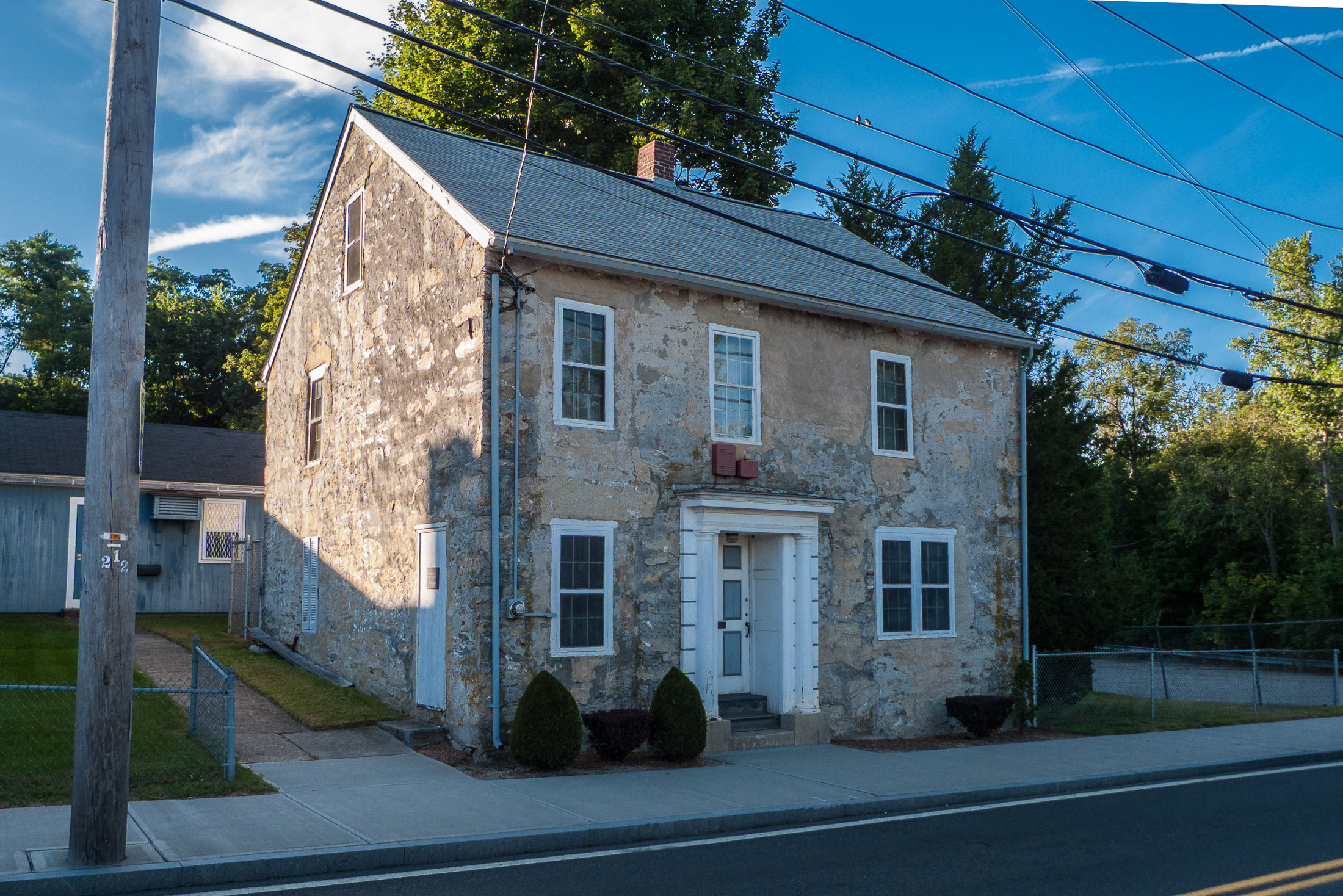
- Allenville Mill Storehouse in 2013

- Location within Rhode Island Location within the United States
- Location: Esmond, Rhode Island
- Coordinates: 41°52′41″N 71°30′9″W
- Built: 1813
- NRHP reference No.: 72000033
- Added to NRHP: January 20, 1972

Allenville Mill Storehouse (also known as Company Storehouse or Allenville) is a historic mill storehouse at 5 Esmond Street in Esmond, Rhode Island within the town of Smithfield, Rhode Island. The exact date of construction is unknown, but it was built with rubble masonry construction which was typical of mill construction during and after the War of 1812. In 1813, Phillip Allen purchased 4.5 acres of land and constructed a mill on the site, but the first record to specifically refer to the storehouse was an insurance policy from 1836. Allen sold the property in 1857 and it changed ownership several times before it became Esmond Mills in 1906. In 1937, the building was used as a post office and described erroneously as the "Old Allenville Mill". The building has had some alterations to the front door and possibly the addition of a side door, but the interior of the structure was not detailed in the National Register of Historic Places nomination. The Allenville Mill Storehouse was added to the National Register of Historic Places in 1972.

== History ==
The Allenville Mill Storehouse is a 30-foot (9.1 m) two story square stone rubble-construction storehouse erected by Phillip Allen. The exact date of construction is unknown, but it was built with rubble-construction as was typical of mill construction during and after the War of 1812. In 1813, Allen purchased 4.5 acres from Esek Smith to construct a mill on the empty land. The exact date the mill and the storehouse was built is unknown, but Allen's brother, Zachariah, noted in his diary a payment from "P. Allen for building his factory" on March 5, 1821. The first record of the building is from an 1836 insurance policy obtained by Philip Allen for the cotton factory and a "Store and cloth room". Further evidence it was used as the storehouse comes from a lithographic map from 1858 and in the town's deeds. Allen sold the property in 1857 and it changed owners again in 1860, and was renamed to the Smithfield Manufacturing Company. Ownership changed in 1879, and it was renamed Enfield Mills and transferred again in 1906 and renamed Esmond Mills. In 1937, the building was used as a post office and described erroneously as the "Old Allenville Mill". The discovery that it was a storehouse and not the mill was made only during the National Register of Historic Places survey.

In 1971, the National Register of Historic Places nomination noted that the "original fenestration is largely evident, although the eastern first story window of the front facade has been somewhat enlarged. This and other alterations may have occurred during the last decades of the nineteenth century or the early years of the twentieth when the building became the United States Post Office." One of these alterations appears to be the side entrance on the southwestern side of the building, Candee hypothesizes that it may have replaced an original window. Another modification appears to have been made to the main entrance which has a flat pedimented front door that is framed with columns protruding on plinths. The main door is also surrounded with "wooden rustification", but it is noted that this alteration to the main entrance "provides an important visual point to the simple building." In 1971, the National Register of Historic Places nomination did not detail the interior, but an included photo noted the windows were boarded up and it was listed as being for rent. A photo from 2013 shows that the structure has since been renovated and remains well-maintained.

== Significance ==
The Allenville Mill Storehouse was long considered to be the Allenville Mill, including in the 1937 Federal Writer's Project book, but records indicate this was the storehouse of the mill constructed in 1813. Despite not being the mill complex, the storehouse is the earliest surviving example of the 19th-century company storehouses in Rhode Island, and one of only a few surviving examples of company storehouses remaining from the 19th century. Furthermore, the property was erected and owned by the Governor of Rhode Island and later United States Senator Phillip Allen. It was added to the National Register of Historic Places in 1972.

== See also ==
- National Register of Historic Places listings in Providence County, Rhode Island
