= TGI Fridays =

American restaurant chain

TGI Fridays Franchisor, LLC
- Trade name: TGI Fridays
- Type: Private
- Industry: Restaurants
- Genre: Casual dining
- Founded: March 15, 1965; 61 years ago New York City, U.S.
- Founder: Alan Stillman and Daniel R. Scoggin
- Headquarters: Dallas, Texas, U.S.
- Number of locations: ~400 (including 69 in US)
- Area served: Argentina, Australia, Azerbaijan, Bahrain, Barbados, Belarus, Brazil, Canada, Chile, China, Costa Rica, Cyprus, Dominican Republic, Egypt, Greece, Guatemala, Honduras, Iceland, India, Jamaica, Japan, Jordan, Kuwait, Malaysia, Mexico, Nicaragua, Norway, Panama, Paraguay, Peru, Philippines, Qatar, Russia, Saudi Arabia, South Korea, Spain, Sri Lanka, Taiwan, Trinidad Tobago, United Arab Emirates, United Kingdom, United States (including Guam)
- Key people: Weldon Spangler (CEO)
- Products: Steaks, chicken, seafood, pasta, burgers, sandwiches, salads
- Revenue: $728 million (2023)
- Owner: TriArtisan Capital Advisors
- Number of employees: 11,000 (2021)
- Website: tgifridays.com

TGI Fridays Franchisor, LLC, doing business as TGI Fridays, (Note: Originally and sometimes still stylized on corporate materials and locations as T.G.I. Friday’s or T.G.I. FRiDAY’S) is an American casual dining restaurant chain focusing primarily on American cuisine. The restaurant's name stands for "Thank God It's Friday". TGI Fridays operates more than 380 locations in more than 35 countries, including 69 in the United States. The chain filed for bankruptcy in the United States on November 2, 2024.

== History ==
=== 20th century ===
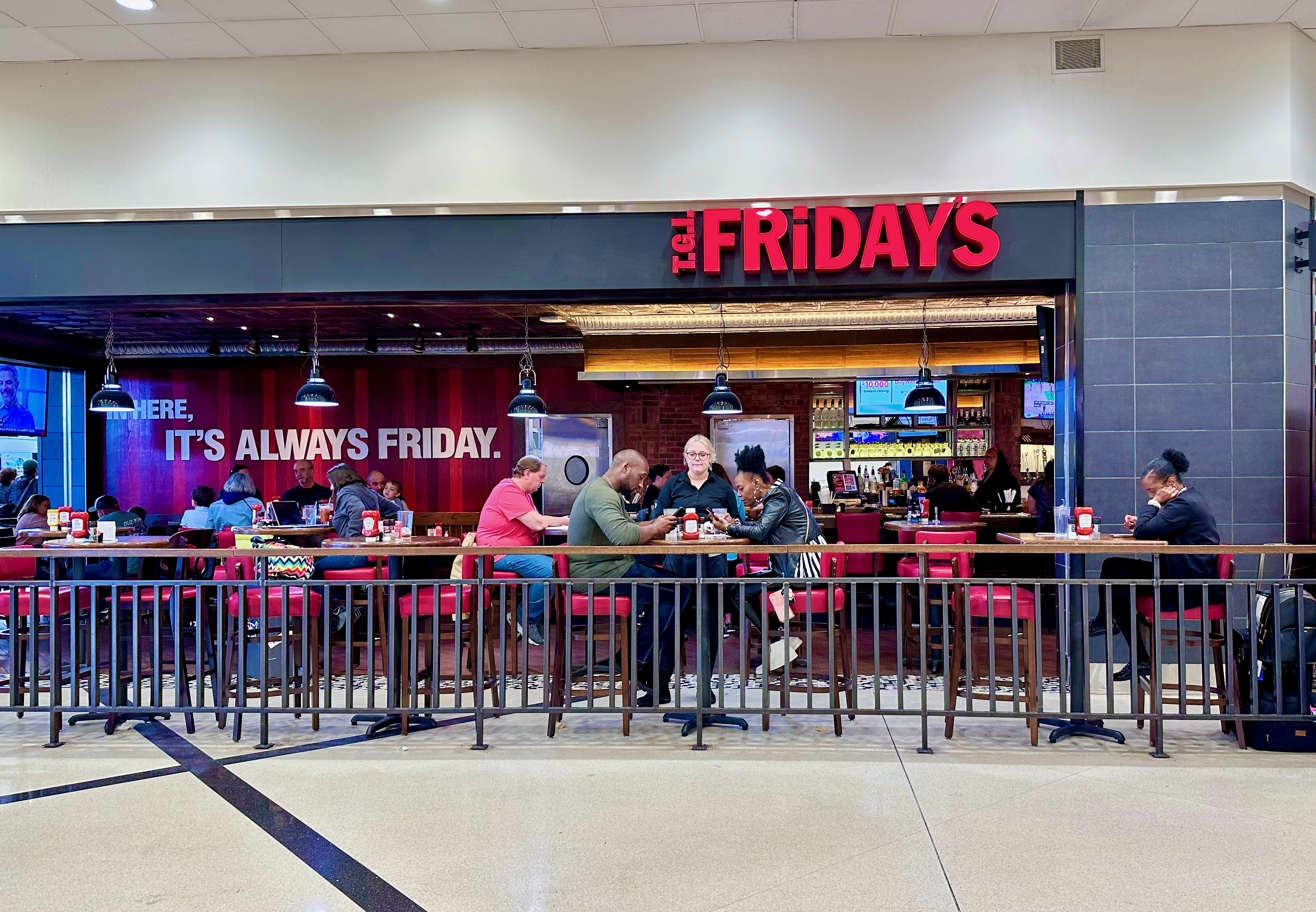
TGI Fridays at Hartsfield-Jackson Atlanta International Airport

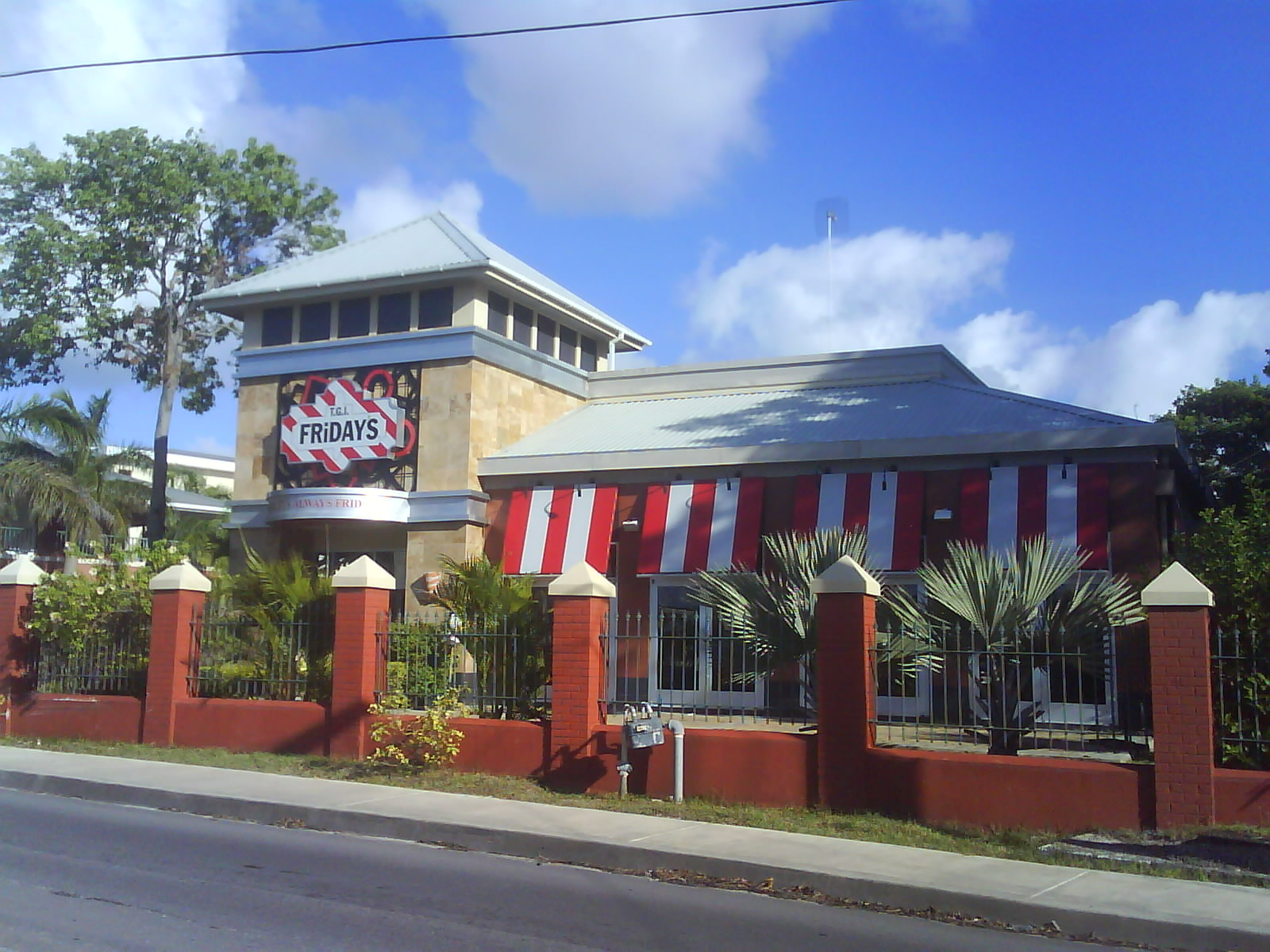
The TGI Fridays in Christ Church, Barbados, which opened in November 2010 and closed less than three years later, in August 2013

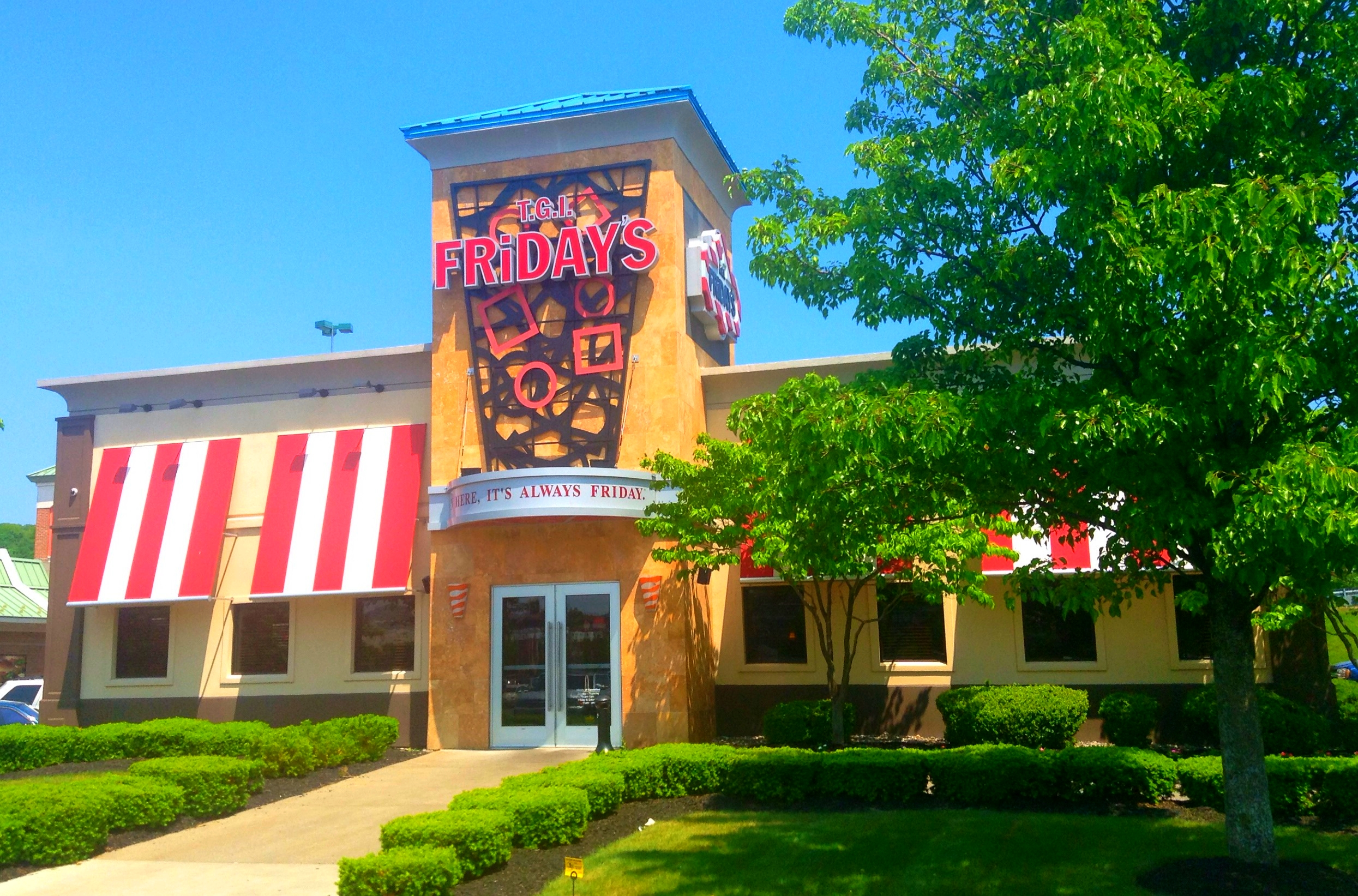
TGI Fridays in Waterbury, Connecticut in June 2014 (closed in October 2024)

The former TGI Fridays logo used until 2013; it is still used in older locations.

In 1965, Alan Stillman opened the first TGI Fridays restaurant in Manhattan. He lived on 63rd Street between First and York Avenues, in a neighborhood with many airline stewardesses, fashion models, secretaries, and other young, single people on the East Side of Manhattan near the Queensboro Bridge. He hoped that opening a bar would help him meet women. Stillman's choices for socializing were non-public cocktail parties or guys' beer-drinking hangout bars that women usually would not visit; he recalled that "there was no public place for people between, say, twenty-three to thirty-seven years old, to meet." He sought to recreate the comfortable cocktail party atmosphere in public despite having no experience in the restaurant business.

With US$5,000 of his own money and $5,000 borrowed from his mother, Stillman purchased a bar he often visited, The Good Tavern at the corner of 63rd Street and First Avenue, and renamed it TGI Fridays after the expression "Thank God it's Friday!" from his years at Bucknell University. The restaurant opened on March 15, 1965, serving standard American cuisine, bar food, and alcoholic beverages, and emphasized food quality and preparation.

The exterior featured a red-and-white striped awning and blue paint; the Gay Nineties interior included Tiffany-style lamps, wooden floors, Bentwood chairs, and striped tablecloths; and the bar area added brass rails and stained glass. The employees were young men: handsome jocks in form-fitting red-and-white striped soccer shirts; when a patron was celebrating a birthday, the entire restaurant crew came around with a cake and sang TGI Fridays' traditional birthday song. Footage of interviews with patrons from this TGI Fridays was featured in Robert Downey Sr.'s film No More Excuses (1968). The first location closed in 1994 and became a British-style pub called "Baker Street".

Although Malachy McCourt's nearby Malachy's singles bar preceded TGI Fridays and Stillman credited the media for creating the term, he had unintentionally created one of the first singles bars. It benefited from the near-simultaneous availability of the birth-control pill and Betty Friedan's book The Feminine Mystique:

I don't think there was anything else like it at the time. Before TGI Fridays, four single twenty-five-year-old girls were not going out on Friday nights, in public and with each other, to have a good time. They went to people's apartments for cocktail parties or they might go to a real restaurant for a date or for somebody's birthday, but they weren't going out with each other to a bar for a casual dinner and drinks because there was no such place for them to go.

TGI Fridays was one of the first to use promotions such as ladies' night, and Stillman achieved his hopes of meeting women; "Have you seen the movie Cocktail? Tom Cruise played me!...Why do girls want to date the bartender? To this day, I'm not sure that I get it." He and the restaurant benefited from its location—according to Stillman, 480 stewardesses lived in the apartment building next door—and received publicity in national magazines. TGI Fridays became so popular that it had to install ropes to create an area for those waiting in line, also unusual at the time for a restaurant. A competitor, Maxwell's Plum, opened across the street, and others soon followed.

With fellow Bucknell University graduate Ben Benson, Stillman opened other restaurants, including Tuesday's, Thursday's, Wednesday's, and Ice Cream Sunday's. Franchising of TGI Fridays began two years after the Manhattan location opened, in a since-closed location in Memphis, Tennessee's Overton Square district.

In 1971, Daniel R. Scoggin acquired the rights to eight major Midwest cities. In 1972, he opened with the first of a new prototype in Dallas. The raised square bar and multilevel dining became the company standard. Dallas doubled the sales and tripled profits of TGI Fridays' previous best. Families began visiting the new suburban locations during the day for casual food; "it took six or seven years, but T.G.I. Fridays became a very different animal", Stillman said. Attracted by this performance, he merged into the Dallas franchise, forming TGI Fridays, Inc., and Scoggin was the CEO for the next 15 years. Scoggin is credited with the then-new 200-seat prototype and many of the TGI Fridays innovations including a large from-scratch menu, potato skins, bartender Olympics, and frozen drinks.

In 1975, the company was sold to Carlson Companies, and Stillman and the original investors departed. Stillman kept the original location and, now married, founded Smith & Wollensky in 1977 with Benson. Scoggin continued as CEO on an earn-out contract and finalized his sale in 1980, signing a new contract to continue as the company's CEO.

When the company was passing through the 100-store mark, it issued an initial public offering in 1983 with Goldman Sachs. Scoggin developed the first international franchise and the template for future international development. The first restaurant was opened in the UK with Whitbread PLC. By the time Scoggin departed in 1986, the company had widened its appeal: alcohol consumption was de-emphasized, and quality was emphasized over quantity. The company became privately held again in 1989. The focus was then switched from singles to families.

A brand extension, combining the TGI Fridays concept with the atmosphere of a sports bar, called "Fridays Front Row Sports Grill", is found at two Major League Baseball stadiums which each overlook the playing field: Chase Field in Phoenix, Arizona and Miller Park in Milwaukee. There was also a Friday's Front Row Grill for a few seasons at Globe Life Park, then the Texas Rangers home field.

=== 21st century ===
The chain peaked in 2008, having 601 restaurants in the US generating $2 billion in revenue. By 2023, sales had fallen to $728 million.

In October 2009, Haymarket broke the world record for biggest profit made in any week, throughout TGI Fridays' history, and it has been home to several past winners from the bartenders Olympics, a contest started by Scoggin.

On May 20, 2014, TGI Fridays was sold to Sentinel Capital Partners and TriArtisan Capital Partners. In October 2019, TriArtisan acquired Sentinel's stake in TGI Fridays.

Allegro Merger began working towards taking Fridays public in 2019, buying it away from MFP Partners and TriArtisan Capital, but withdrawing in April 2020.

Utz Quality Foods entered a marketing agreement with Inventure Foods in 2017 to use the "TGI Fridays" name for some of its snacks.

In the UK, TGI Fridays re-branded to "Fridays", dropping the "TGI" prefix during 2020. About three years later, the naming reverted to "TGI Fridays".

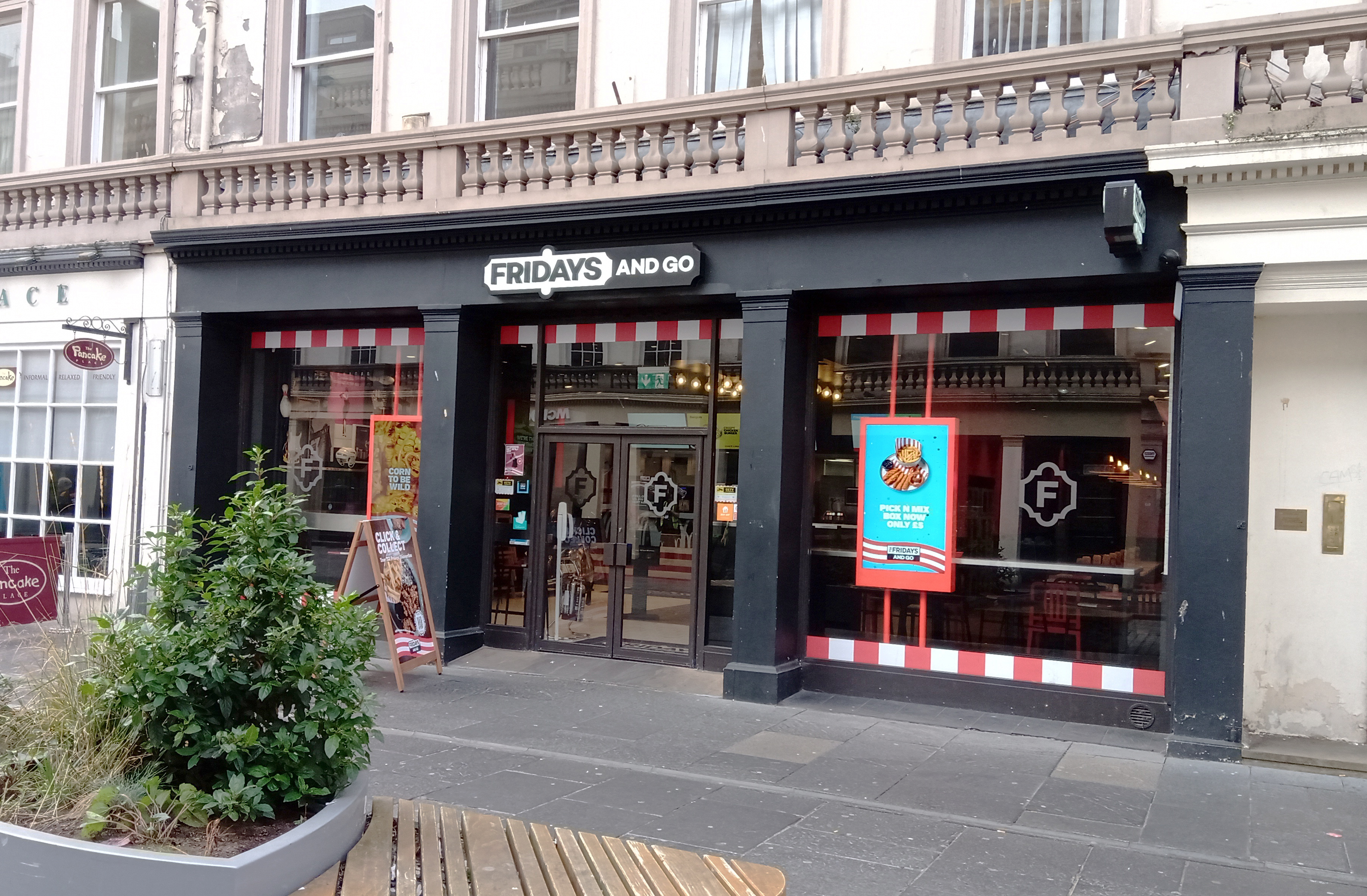
"Fridays and Go" in Dundee, Scotland

In March 2022, the first "Fridays and Go", a takeaway and quick service version of TGI Fridays, launched in Dundee, Scotland. Despite initial plans to open up to thirty other branches, it remained the sole example until it closed in October 2024 following the sale of the bankrupt UK franchise.

In December 2023, SouthRock Capital, the operator of all of the TGI Fridays locations in Brazil, declared bankruptcy, continuing to operate most TGI Fridays locations normally while closing a few underperforming ones, while restructuring through the bankruptcy procedure. SouthRock Capital later declared Chapter 15 bankruptcy in June 2024.

On January 4, 2024, TGI Fridays abruptly closed 36 underperforming restaurants and sold eight more to former CEO Ray Blanchette. Most employees were offered transfer to other locations.

In April 2024, TGI Fridays entered an agreement to be acquired by Hostmore LLC, the owner of TGI Friday's restaurants in the UK, and for the combined company to go public on the London Stock Exchange.

In May 2024 in the US, TGI Friday's entered a licensing agreement with Kraft Heinz to sell TGI Fridays-branded appetizers in supermarkets.

=== Bankruptcy ===
In September 2024, TGI Fridays lost day-to-day control of its assets after failing to submit documents to bondholders on time, with consulting firm FTI Consulting taking temporary control. As a result, Hostmore LLC, the owner of TGI Friday's UK restaurants, dropped its plans to acquire TGI Fridays and went into administration, putting an estimated 4,500 jobs at risk. A month later, on October 7, 2024, private equity firms Calveton UK and Breal Capital acquired 51 sites and saved 2,389 jobs, but didn't acquire 35 sites which immediately closed, resulting in the loss of 1,012 jobs.

On October 19, 2024, TGI Fridays announced it was seeking financing as it warned that it was preparing to file for Chapter 11 bankruptcy in the United States within the coming weeks. The company blamed its bankruptcy on rising interest rates, increased competition and heavy debt. On November 2, 2024, TGI Fridays filed for Chapter 11 bankruptcy. The company's press release specifically cited its capital structure as one primary driver of its bankruptcy filing.

On January 2, 2025, it was announced that former CEO Ray Blanchette and his company Sugarloaf Hospitality – which owns seven TGI Fridays franchised restaurants in the US – had been chosen to manage all of TGI Friday's franchised restaurants worldwide. It was also announced that nine of the company's 39 corporate-owned restaurants had been sold to MERA Corp, a TGI Fridays franchisee based in Cancún, Mexico, for $34.5 million, outbidding Blanchette – who had made a bid of $30 million – for the locations. The sale allows TGI Fridays to repay its $23.9 million bankruptcy loan, with about $8 million in cash left over. On January 29, 2025, it was announced TGI Fridays UK's flagship restaurant in Leicester Square, London, had closed down. On January 30, 2025, it was reported that 30 more locations had closed, which left the chain with only around 100 locations remaining in the US.

On February 3, 2025, it was announced that 19 of TGI Fridays' corporate-owned restaurants had been sold to two separate franchisees: three to Sugarloaf Hospitality and 16 to Yadav Enterprises, and that TGI Fridays had rejected the leases for six more restaurants.

On 31 October 2025, it was announced that Sugarloaf TGIF Management had acquired TGI Friday's 49 UK restaurants from Calveton UK and Breal Capital as part of an international consolidation of the brand under Ray Blanchette. Sugarloaf is establishing a UK-led management team for the restaurants. However, less than three months later, on 14 January 2026, TGI Fridays closed 16 restaurants and went into administration for the second time in a year.

== Controversies ==
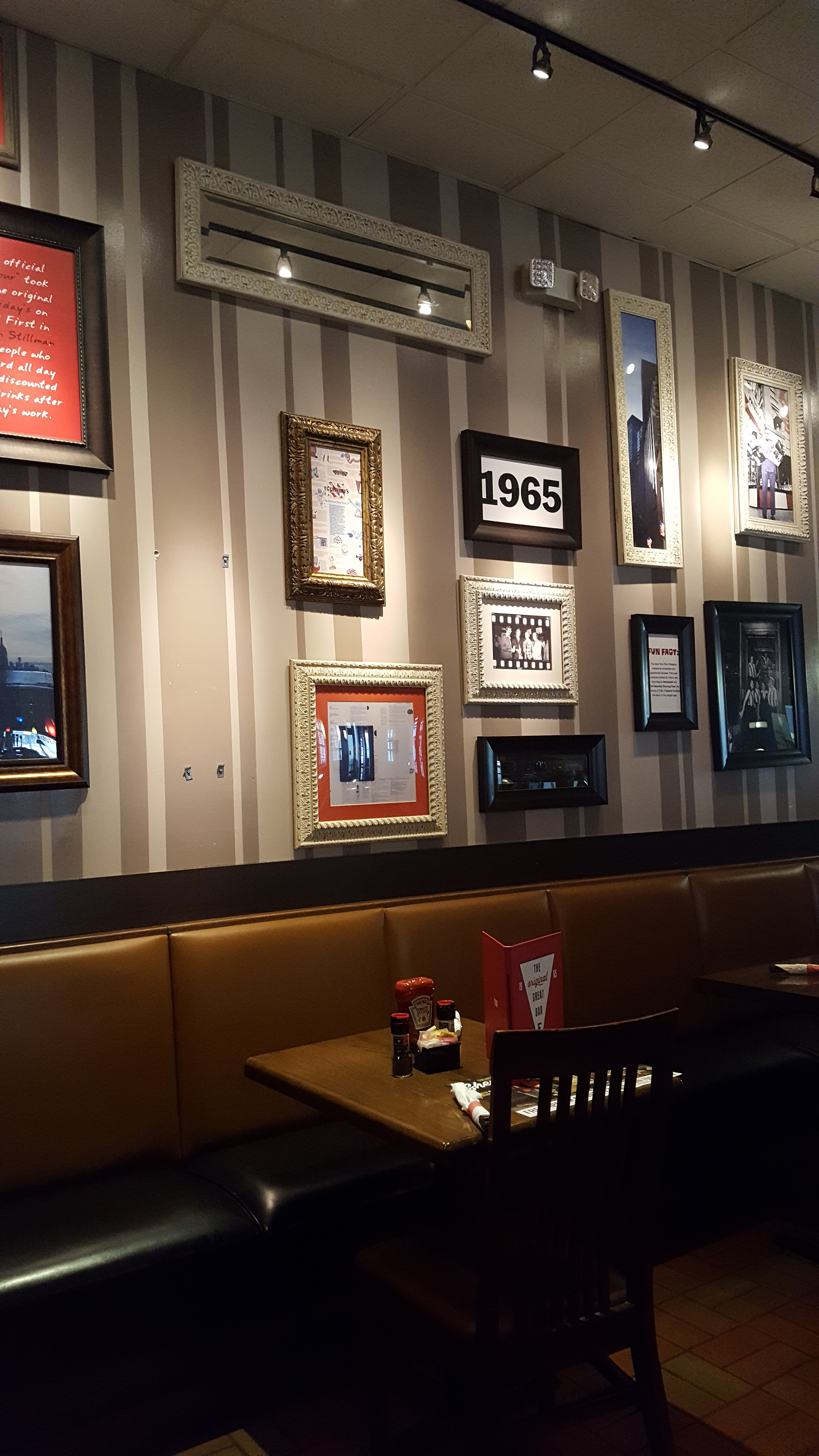
Picture frames on a wall at a TGI Friday's by Glenbrook Mall in Fort Wayne, Indiana in March 2020; this location later closed.

- In 2013, as part of "Operation Swill", investigators in New Jersey raided 17 TGI Fridays franchised restaurants owned by The Briad Group. They found that the bars were replacing premium brand alcoholic beverages with lower-cost brands yet charging patrons for the more expensive liquor.
- In 2018, a tipping policy change prompted strikes across TGI Fridays restaurants in the United Kingdom as waiting staff took issue with a decision to redistribute 20% of customer tips paid by card to kitchen staff in lieu of a raise.
- In 2022, during the Russian invasion of Ukraine, TGI Fridays was criticized by Jeffrey Sonnenfeld of Yale for "digging in" (defying demands for exit or reduction of activities). TGI Fridays issued a statement saying that it stood with the people of Ukraine, that the decision whether to close was for local franchisees to make, and that any proceeds received would be donated to Mercy Chefs, an organisation supporting humanitarian efforts in Ukraine.
- In 2022, the US restaurants faced a class-action lawsuit over the content of the TGI Fridays-branded mozzarella stick snack food manufactured by Inventure Foods, sold in grocery stores. Litigants claimed the extruded corn snacks contained no mozzarella cheese. Inventure Foods settled the claims for $900,000, agreeing to pay up to $6 per household, in February 2024.

== Franchises ==
TGI Fridays is a franchising operation, with franchisees owning most of the outlets. In 2011, the largest franchisee was The Briad Group in New Jersey, which ran 72 restaurants in six states. Briad sold its franchises in 2020.

Whitbread PLC, with 45 locations in the United Kingdom, was a major international franchisee until 2007. On January 17, 2007, Whitbread sold operating rights to all 45 restaurants back to TGI Fridays UK Limited (a consortium consisting of Carlson Restaurants Worldwide Inc. and ABN Amro Capital) thus exiting a partnership formed in 1986.

TGI Fridays has also been used as a restaurant for hotels run by Country Inns & Suites by Carlson brand.

On 18 September 2024, Hostmore PLC entered administration; all UK restaurant locations were offered for sale. 51 sites were sold the following month, while a further 35 closed.

=== List of countries with TGI Fridays ===
==== Africa ====
| Country | Number of locations |
|---|---|
| Egypt | 4 |

==== Americas ====
| Country | Number of locations |
|---|---|
| Argentina | 1 |
| Brazil | 8 |
| Canada | 3 |
| Chile | 1 |
| Dominican Republic | 2 |
| Ecuador | 4 |
| Guatemala | 3 |
| Honduras | 3 |
| Jamaica | 2 |
| Nicaragua | 1 |
| Mexico | 10 |
| Panama | 9 |
| Paraguay | 3 |
| Peru | 22 |
| Trinidad and Tobago | 4 |
| United States | 69 |

==== Asia ====
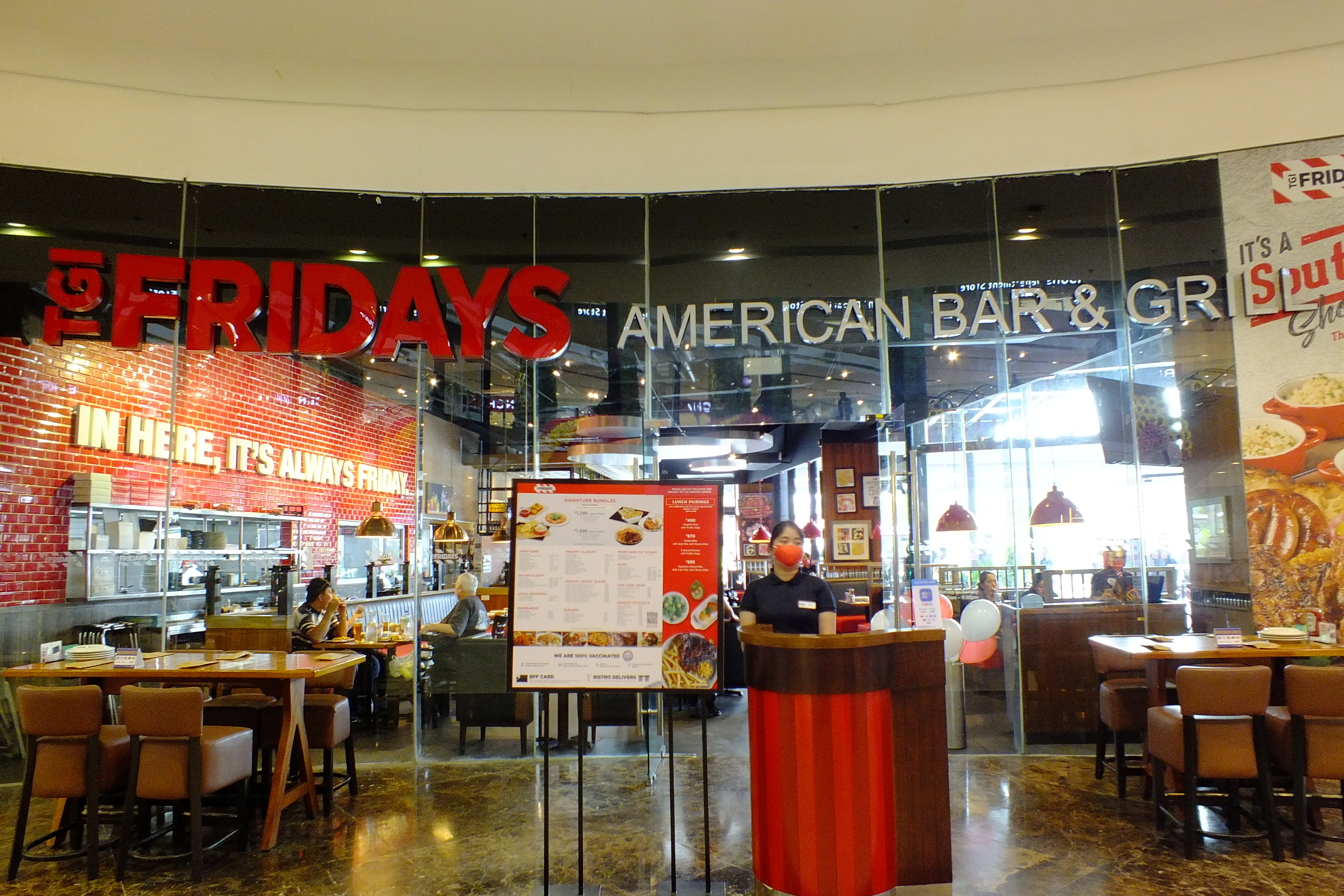
TGI Friday's at Robinsons Galleria Cebu in Cebu City, 2023

| Country | Number of locations |
|---|---|
| Azerbaijan | 1 |
| Bahrain | 3 |
| China | 2 |
| India | 7 |
| Japan | 14 |
| Kuwait | 12 |
| Malaysia | 11 |
| Philippines | 32 |
| Qatar | 4 |
| Saudi Arabia | 12 |
| Sri Lanka | 1 |
| Taiwan | 18 |
| Turkey | 1 |
| United Arab Emirates | 13 |
| Uzbekistan | 1 |

==== Europe ====
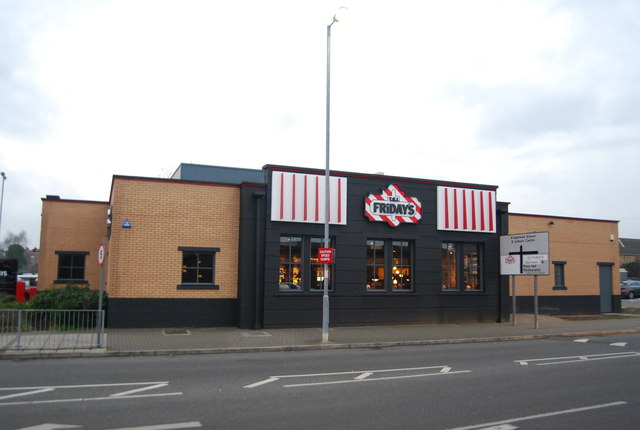
TGI Fridays in Enfield, London, 2013

| Country | Number of locations |
|---|---|
| Belarus | 1 |
| Cyprus | 9 |
| Greece | 13 |
| Iceland | 2 |
| Norway | 3 |
| Russia | 12 |
| Spain | 10 |
| United Kingdom | 33 |

==== Oceania ====
| Country | Number of locations |
|---|---|
| Australia | 18 |
| Guam | 1 |

==== Planned markets ====
| Country | Notes and references |
|---|---|
| Bulgaria | 1 |
| New Zealand | 4 |
| Singapore | 25 |

==== Former markets ====
| Country | Notes and references |
|---|---|
| Afghanistan | A TGI Fridays operated on the boardwalk at Kandahar Airfield during the American military's use of the airport, closing in 2013. |
| Denmark | One TGI Friday's at Højbro Plads 5-7 in Copenhagen from 2015 to 2020. Closed due to the corona pandemic, and never reopened. |
| Hungary | The only TGI Friday's in Budapest was rebranded on May 18, 2024. |
| Indonesia | The last TGI Friday's restaurants in Jakarta were closed in 2021. |
| New Zealand | Operating in Christchurch from 1994 to 1999. It was the first TGI Fridays branch to close after the owner was indicted for embezzlement. |
| Netherlands | TGI Fridays exited the Netherlands in 2024 due to bankruptcy, closing its Utrecht and Rotterdam locations. |
| Singapore | In Singapore, the first TGI Fridays opened on Penang Road in 1992, followed by two additional branches on Orchard Road and East Coast Road in 2017. All three outlets, operated by different franchisors, closed within two years of their respective openings. |
| South Korea | TGI Fridays exited South Korea in March 31, 2025 after 33 years of operation. The chain's domestic operator, MFG Korea, decided to close all 14 remaining locations. |
| Sweden | TGI Fridays exited Sweden in 2024 due to bankruptcy, closing all 32 locations, primarily in Stockholm. |
| Austria | TGI Fridays exited Austria in 2021 also due to bankruptcy, closing one location in Vienna. It was the only restaurant in Austria. |
| Costa Rica | The TGI Fridays's restaurants ceased operations permanently in 2025 after announcing the cessation of their activities and holding liquidation and garage sales of their equipment. |
| Ireland | The only TGI Fridays in Ireland closed in 2026. |

== Design ==
The newer TGI Fridays franchises (as well as redesigned restaurants) are more contemporary, with wallpaper, granite exteriors, and red-and-white striped lamps instead of Tiffany. The exteriors have stucco, the entrance doors have F-shaped handles, and a metal cup above the door has a stripe saying "In Here, It's always Friday". The logo design was evolved in 2013 by Jane MacDowall and her creative team in Scotland. Most TGI Fridays have a propeller and a rowing scull on display as part of their antiques, which are actually a part of a story told to all TGI Fridays employees; the scull always contains a pair of saddle shoes and a bottle of champagne to remind employees of the value of teamwork, leadership, and celebrating success. The propeller is always above or near the bar. The thought is that the bar "propels" the restaurant.

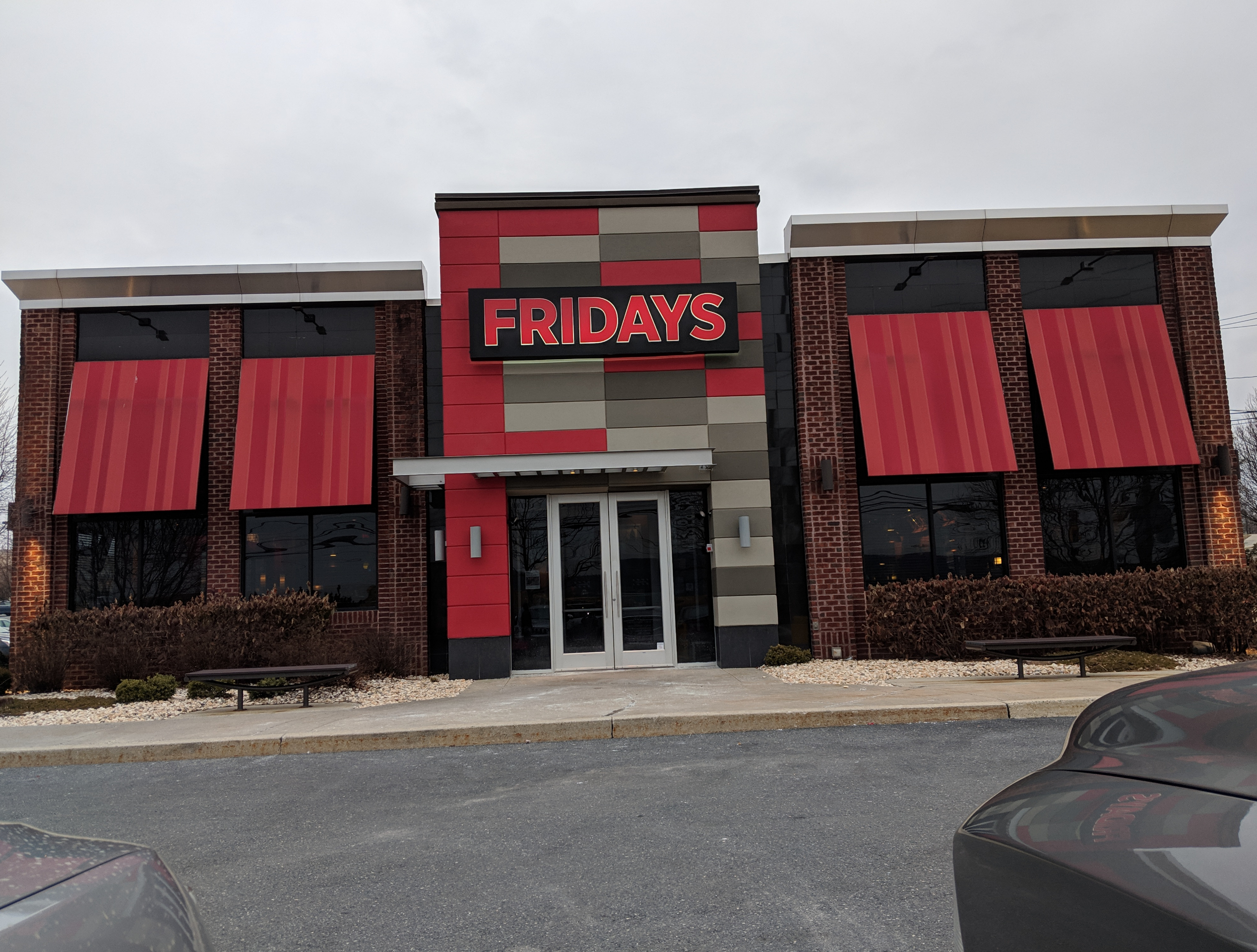
A TGI Fridays in Easton, Pennsylvania, that uses the new design, seen in February 2019.

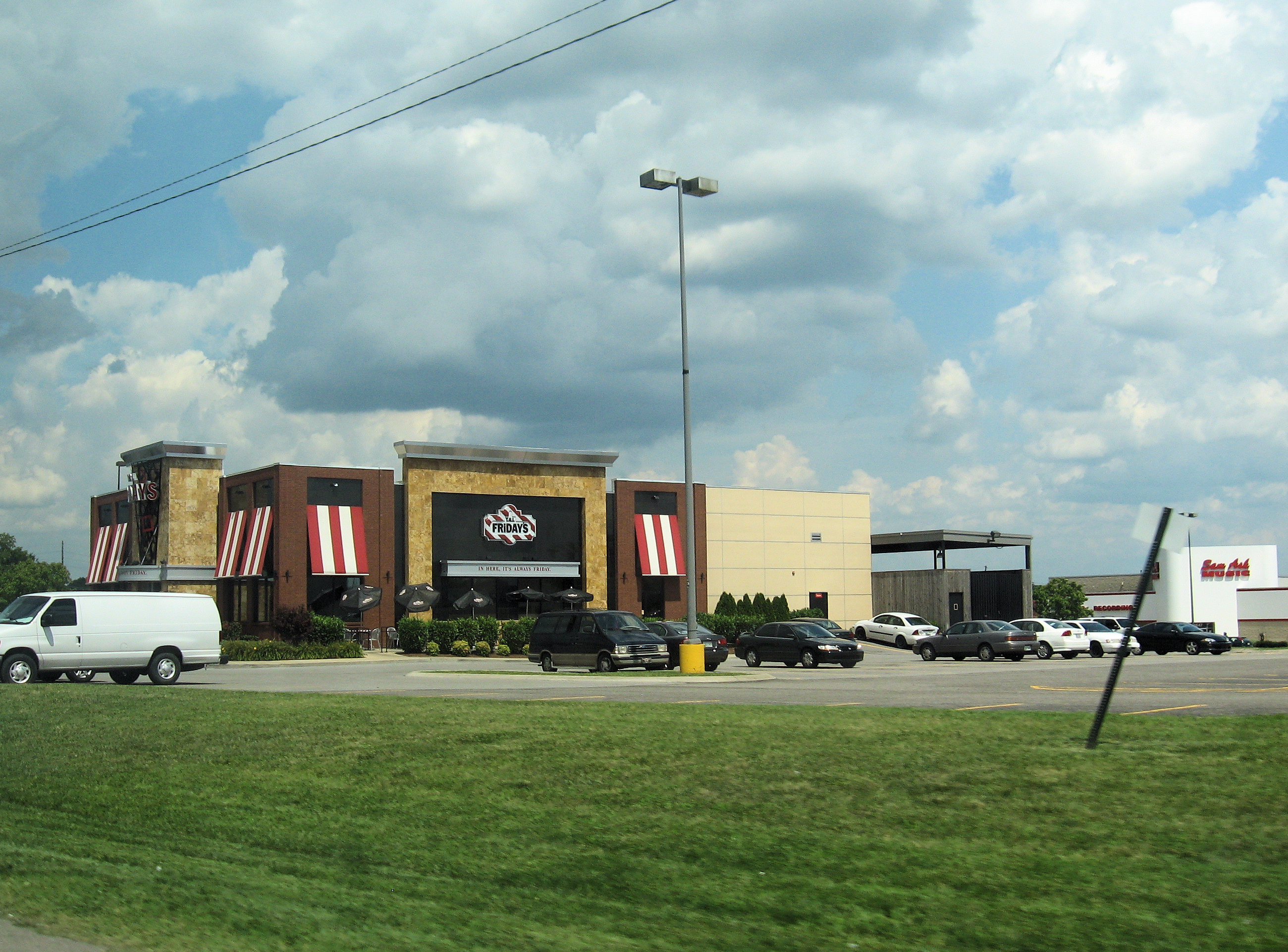
TGI Fridays in Goodlettsville, Tennessee, in July 2009 (closed in 2019).

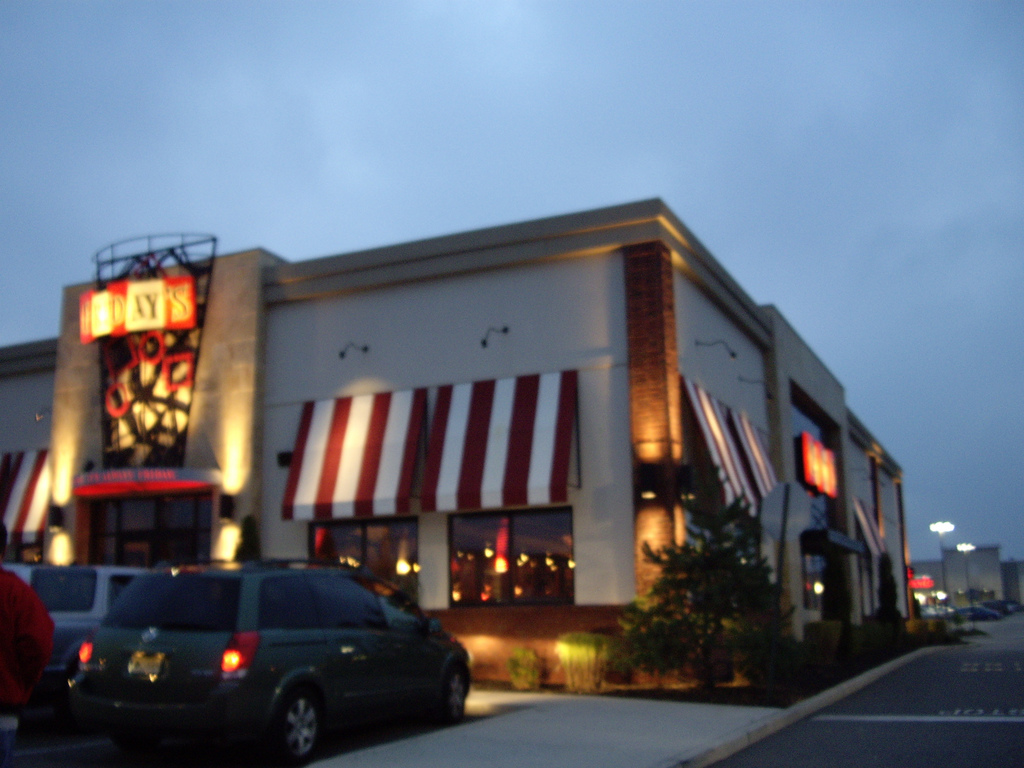
A TGI Fridays in Manahawkin, New Jersey, that opened in 2003 with the new design, seen in November 2006.

== Menu ==
Fridays has a large menu with an emphasis on alcoholic beverages. These drinks come in liquid as well as frozen form and TGI often runs specials or creates unique drinks based on seasonality and location.

TGI Fridays formerly served Atkins-approved appetizers, entrées, and desserts. In 2006, the Atkins name was removed from the menu when Atkins filed for bankruptcy, but the restaurant continues to offer both low-carbohydrate and low-fat menu items. The UK and US menus offer gluten-free items.

== See also ==
- List of casual dining restaurant chains
- List of restaurants in New York City
- Flair bartending
