= Esmond, Rhode Island =

Esmond
- Village
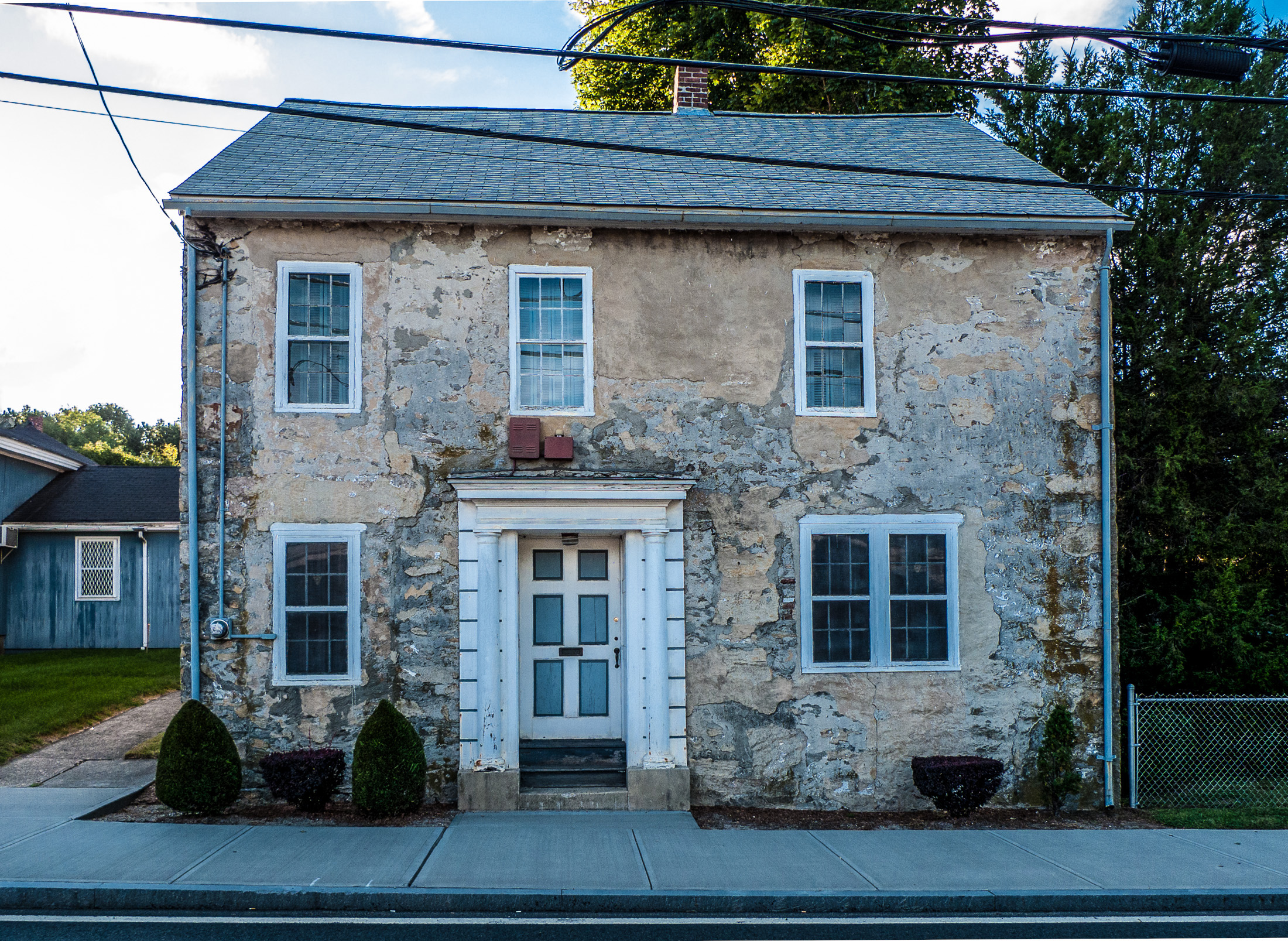
- Allenville Mill Storehouse

- Location within the state of Rhode Island
- Coordinates: 41°52′20″N 71°29′40″W
- Country: United States
- State: Rhode Island
- County: Providence
- Town: Smithfield
- Time zone: UTC-5 (Eastern (EST))
  - Summer (DST): UTC-4 (EDT)
- ZIP codes: 02917-2808

Esmond is a historic mill village in Smithfield, Rhode Island, United States. Old County Road School, East Smithfield Public Library, and the historic Allenville Mill are located in the village.

Located in Esmond is the former Esmond Mill, which operated from 1906 to 1948. After its closure, the Esmond Mill became the corporate headquarters for Benny's.

Esmond has its own postal code: 02917-2808.
