= Building 19 =

Defunct Massachusetts discount store chain

Building #19
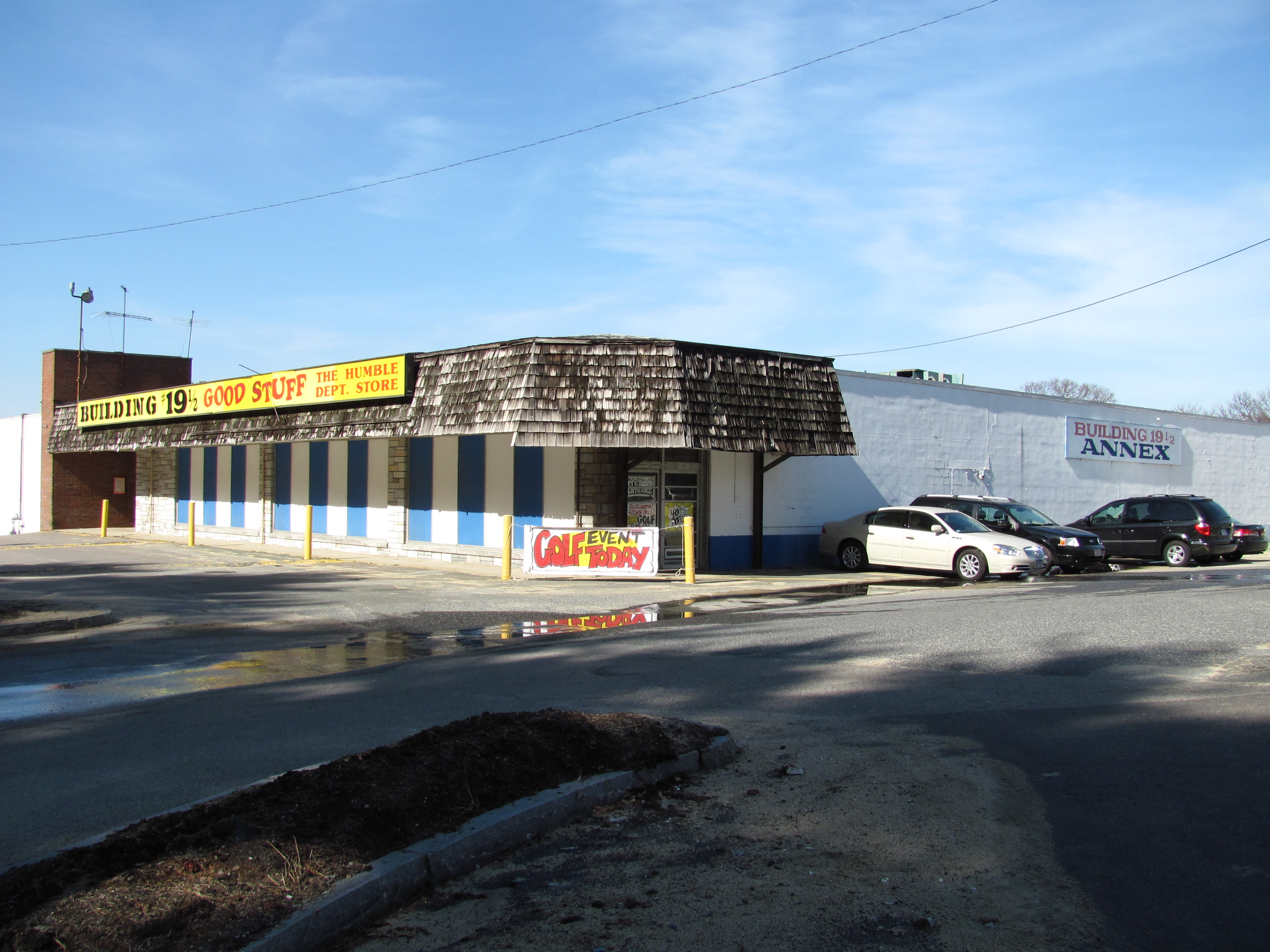
- Branch store in Burlington, Massachusetts (2010)
- Industry: Discount retail
- Founded: Hingham, Massachusetts (1964)
- Founder: Jerry Ellis (born Gerald Elovitz); Harry Andler
- Defunct: 2013
- Fate: Bankruptcy; 2 stores reopened as "The Rug Department", assets acquired by Ollie's Bargain Outlet
- Headquarters: Hingham, Massachusetts, United States
- Number of locations: 10 stores (2013)
- Area served: New England
- Key people: William Elovitz (President)
- Revenue: $79.2m (2013)

Building #19 was a New England chain of discount closeout retailers that operated from 1964 until it declared bankruptcy in 2013. At the time of its bankruptcy, it had thirteen stores. The family that owned the chain later reopened two of the former locations as a part of a new business, The Rug Department, that was limited to rugs and related merchandise. However, these locations in Norwood and Burlington closed in 2014.

The “closeout stores" had been known throughout New England for selling an eclectic assortment of items at drastically discounted prices, as well as self-effacing advertising that made fun of the founder, Jerry Ellis. Many of the items were factory irregulars, discontinued models, post-expiration-date, damaged, or less than perfect in some other way, but some new merchandise was offered as well. The stores capitalized on the quick cash flow needs of other businesses, obtaining most of their merchandise from fire sales, overstocks, customs seizures, liquidations, bankruptcy courts, and dumpster diving.

On November 1, 2013, Building #19 Inc. and a number of affiliated companies voluntarily filed for Chapter 11 bankruptcy protection in the United States Bankruptcy Court for the District of Massachusetts. Ellis said that the business had been "on a downhill slope for 10 years", and attributed its failure to Internet competition, overseas manufacturing, and improved fire protection of warehouses. The latter two factors reduced the supply of salvage and surplus products to sell.

== History ==
Jerry Ellis (born Gerald Elovitz) founded the original store in 1964 with Harry Andler, when the two joined to sell a stock of appliances. The original Building #19 was located at the former Bethlehem Hingham Shipyard, where the buildings were numbered, and the store retained the nondescript name on the building rather than pay for a new sign. Andler was doing surplus and salvage business in the shipyard for several years. The unique combination of Ellis' advertising flair and Andler's expertise in finding and buying distressed merchandise accounts for the early success of the business. Andler bought "good stuff cheap" and Ellis let everyone know about it with amusing advertising.

In 1971, when the windows began to fall out of the John Hancock Tower in Boston, Ellis and Andler were offered and bought the defective window panels that were scheduled to be replaced. This got the company national press and attention.

In 1979, retailers Building #19 and Bloomingdales both appeared as contrasting locations in the film Starting Over.

In the 1980s, the original Building #19 moved to the former GEM (Government Employee Merchandise) building on Derby Street in Hingham, Massachusetts. Later, Building #19 1/8 opened in the old Stuart's store in the Harborlight Mall on Rt 3A in Weymouth, Massachusetts; still later that store was closed to build a Lowe's Store. The main store Building #19 moved from Derby Street in Hingham and was situated in Weymouth at the old Caldor/Zayre's/Ames building on Massachusetts Route 18.

In 2002, Building #19 bought out the independent discount store Spag's in Shrewsbury, Massachusetts, and renamed the acquisition "Spag's 19". The store format and configuration were changed after the purchase, to more closely resemble the other Building #19 operations. However, the store was closed in May 2013.

Several years after the chain shut, formerly competing Ollie's Bargain Outlet opened a store in Worcester, Massachusetts which is branded as "Ollie's Bargain Outlet @ Building #19." It is an actual former Building #19 location and is intended to pay homage to the now-defunct chain. Additionally, the Plymouth, MA store has the same branding as the Worcester location, even though the location is in a former Kmart store. The assets of Building #19 were acquired by Ollie's.

As of June 2022, nearly all Building #19 locations have been demolished or redeveloped into supermarkets, storage facilities, or other discount stores. The Pawtucket location and its signage still stands. The signage in Haverhill, featuring cartoon figures from locally inspired Archie comics, remained until at least October 2015, and the location still retains an awning and exterior paint job in the chain's color scheme. As of 2025, this location is being converted into self storage.

== Corporate culture ==
The chain was known for its often self-deprecating humor, both in their advertising and throughout their store interiors. Their weekly ad circulars often featured caricatures of founder Jerry Ellis with a number of sarcastic captions, many of which were repeated in their in-store advertising. The early circulars featured the "free-spirit" Ellis sternly commanded to work harder by the "skinflint" Andler. As of 2012, Ellis still wrote most of the ad copy used in the ad flyers.

Each Building #19 location offered free coffee with "free fake cream". Signs near the free coffee stand warned customers not to make fun of the poor quality of the coffee, because "someday you'll be old and weak too". Their price guarantee awarded a bottle of "Chateau du Cheapo" champagne if a competitor beat their price.

In 2006, Building #19 put a cartoon in their President's Day advertising flier showing A-shirts (athletic style undershirts) labeled as being "Wife-Beater" shirts. Building #19 was criticized, and promptly apologized. Two years later, a flier poked fun at the 2006 controversy, and was similarly criticized.

The main Building #19 store was located in Hingham, Massachusetts; other stores had a numerical fraction appended to their name (such as Building #19½, in Burlington or Building #19¾, in Norwood). Building #19 1/9, in Pawtucket, Rhode Island, used the old grandstand portion of Narragansett Park - a former horse racing venue that had closed in 1978.

=== Slogans ===
- "Good Stuff... Cheap"
- "Suffer a Little, Save a Lot"
- "The Humble Department Store"
- "Support the three-day work week"
- "America's messiest department store"
- "Please leave with at least as many children as you came with"
- "Our business is like sex. When it's good, it's wonderful. And when it's bad, it's still pretty good."
- "Free admission on all days ending with the letter Y"
- "We Now Accept Credit Cods"

== See also ==
- Christmas Tree Shops
- Ocean State Job Lot
- The Akron
- Tuesday Morning
- Ollie's Bargain Outlet
