= The Briad Group =

Franchising company in New Jersey, US

- Type: Private
- Industry: Hospitality
- Founded: 1987; 39 years ago
- Founder: Brad Honigfeld
- Headquarters: Livingston, New Jersey, U.S.
- Number of locations: 121 franchised
- Area served: United States
- Key people: Brad Honigfeld
- Products: Wendy's, Marriott, and Hilton (franchisee)
- Revenue: US$400,000,000
- Number of employees: 6,489
- Website: http://www.briad.com

The Briad Group are based in Livingston, New Jersey with over 120 franchise locations in the United States under the brands TGI Fridays, Wendy's, Marriott, and Hilton. The company was the #1 operator of TGI Fridays franchises.

== History ==
The Briad Group was founded in October 1987 by Brad Honigfeld when he opened his first franchise of Steve's Ice Cream/Carnegie Deli in Princeton, New Jersey. The company opened a Roy Rogers restaurant in North Brunswick Township, New Jersey in 1988 and continued to grow its restaurant business. In 1993, the company opened its first TGI Fridays restaurant in central New Jersey. After the success in its casual-dining division, the company turned the attention to its quick-service division. It discontinued Roy Rogers and started converting into Wendy's Old Fashioned Hamburgers.

In 1997, the company started its hotel business by becoming an operator of a Marriott hotel and a Hilton hotel in 2002. It has developed and operated under these two brands in a dozen of properties.

In 2020, the group sold its TGI Fridays properties.

=== Main Street Restaurant Group ===
Main Street Restaurant Group, Inc. was founded in 1988 to operate food distribution in Phoenix, Arizona. Main Street purchased four TGI Fridays restaurants from TGI Fridays Inc. in 1990 to establish its restaurant operation. The company had aggressively purchased properties and franchise rights from independent operators in many states from 1991 to 1993. The company finally sold its food distribution business and focused solely on restaurant business with development of additional brands. In 2006, Main Street had 56 TGI Fridays, and a dozen of restaurants under other brands. It was the world's largest TGI Fridays franchisee.

In June 2006, The Briad Group made a major investment in its casual-dining division by striking a $119 million deal to acquire Main Street Restaurant Group, Inc. — a publicly traded company — through its wholly owned subsidiary, Briad Main Street, Inc. It was listed as one of the biggest mergers & acquisitions deals of 2006 in the restaurant industry.

=== Controversy ===
In 2013, 13 of The Briad Group's TGI Fridays locations in New Jersey were raided by the New Jersey Division of Alcoholic Beverage Control as part of "Operation Swill". These establishments were allegedly filling premium brand bottles with non-premium brands. The Briad Group paid a fine of $500,000.

== Divisions ==
The Briad Group is organized in four major divisions. Casual-dining division oversees 68 TGI Fridays restaurants. Quick-service division owns and operates 43 Wendy's Old Fashioned Hamburger restaurants.

Lodging division obtained its first Marriott franchise right in 1997. It has grown the limited-service hotel business under the brands of the Courtyard, Residence Inn, SpringHill Suites, Hilton Garden Inn and Homewood Suites. It has developed and operated about a dozen of properties. There is a plan to develop about a dozen more properties.

The company also started its construction division in 1993 to construct and remodel company's restaurants in order to reduce construction costs. The division expanded its scope to construct new hotels. In 2003, the company established Briad Construction Services, LLC to provide construction and development services for other companies.

In November 2025, it was announced Circle K is expanding with two to four new convenience stores and mini travel centers annually in New York over the next several years through a development partnership between The Briad Group and Peachtree Group.

== Rankings ==
After the acquisition of Main Street Restaurant Group, The Briad Group moved its rank to become a major player in restaurant industry and became #1 franchisee of TGI Fridays. The company also received high ranking in many publications. In June 2008, Nation's Restaurant News reviewed the company result of the first full year after the acquisition. It ranked the company #84 in its Top 100 Companies Ranked by U.S. Food Service Revenues. The company was also ranked #13 in revenue growth among restaurant franchisors, franchisees, and other food service companies. In August 2008, Franchise Times ranked The Briad Group #8 in its Top 200 Restaurant Franchisees (Monitor 200). In 2009, Multi-Unit Franchisee Magazine ranked the company #50 among the largest franchisees in every industries.

== See also ==
- List of food companies
