= The Akron =

Defunct American discount department store chain

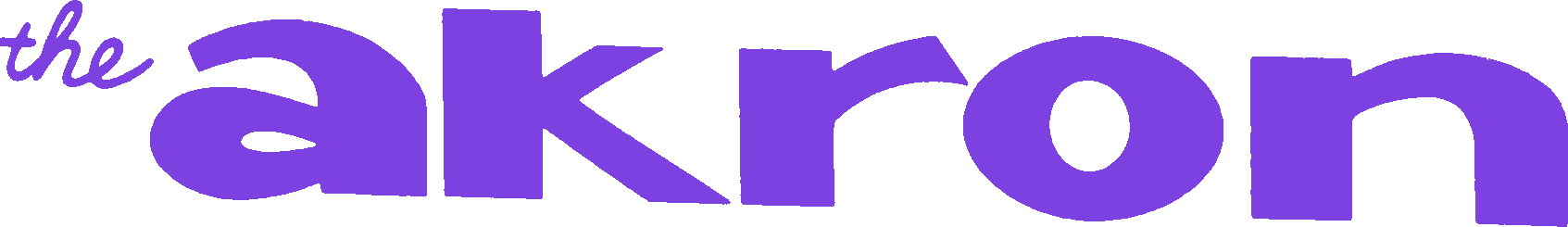
- Type: Discount store
- Industry: Retail
- Founded: 1947; 79 years ago Los Angeles, California
- Founders: Bernard Field; Hyman Fink
- Defunct: 1985; 41 years ago
- Fate: store closures; most locations sold to Circuit City
- Headquarters: Los Angeles, California
- Number of locations: 24
- Areas served: California
- Products: home decor, imports, dining ware, clothing, furniture, electronics, artwork, tropical plants, live monkeys, imported food
- Parent: private (1948-1975); Jack A. Levin & Associates (1975-1976); Thrifty Corp. (1976-1982); Cheong Shing Co. (1982-1985)
- Subsidiaries: Columbus

Akron Stores or The Akron was a Southern California–based imported goods and home decorating department store retail chain established in 1947 and was known to carry unusual merchandise, mostly imports. The chain had over 24 stores throughout Southern California from San Diego to San Francisco before it was forced to close in 1985.

In a 2001 interview in Los Angeles Magazine, co-founder Hyman Fink described selling "everything from handkerchiefs to fire hydrants to motorcycles to live Mexican monkeys" in his stores. The product mix offered in the stores is best described as eclectic and had included home decorating items, cookware, dining ware, food, clothing, electronics, live plants, and furniture. Many items were one of a kind and no one knew what would be in the stores the following week. A 1960 article in the Los Angeles Times described the store as "a pioneer in new and distinctive merchandising techniques" that "long specialized in decorator items from abroad" that included "original Italian oil paintings, native African sculptures from Kenya, and contemporary teakwood furniture from Denmark". The company sometimes describe themselves as a chain of "decorator-style department stores". Women's Wear Daily called the chain a "serendipity" department store.

== History ==
=== Early years ===
In 1947, Bernard Field and Hyman Fink opened the Akron Army & Navy Stores on Sunset Blvd. between Virgil Place and Fountain Avenue by selling mostly army surplus goods. Their first newspaper ad appeared in the October 31, 1947, issue of the Hollywood Citizen-News, and their first magazine ad was seen in the classified ad section of the December 1948 issue of Popular Mechanics magazine for 2-way combat phones while another ad in the same issue advertised Army identification bracelets. The address given in the ad was 4379 Sunset, currently a parking lot for a television studio.

By 1950, Akron Army & Navy had moved to their main location at 4400 Sunset Blvd. In their April 1950 ad in the Los Angeles Times, Akron was selling typewriters, watches, bunk beds, camping gear, power tools, and house paint. Their September 1951 ad in Popular Mechanics was for hand-held power tools. Their February 1952 ad in Popular Science offered telescopes and microscopes. The last mention as the Akron Army & Navy Store occurred in an April 1952 article in the Los Angeles Times describing a fire that caused major damage to their warehouse that was adjacent to their store at 4400 Sunset Blvd. Besides selling to walk-in customers at their store, Akron was selling nationwide via mail order through ads placed in Popular Mechanics and Popular Science magazines during the 1950s.

=== Expansion and growth ===
In 1952 or 1953, the company was renamed The Akron. By June 1953, ads were beginning to appear in the Los Angeles Times in which the firm began to trade under the name The Akron. In these ads, the variety of advertised goods was getting larger, which included such items as clothes, furniture, and live plants. Around this time, the army-navy label was dropped since the new products offered by the firm began to sharply deviate from the usual goods obtain through government surplus. In March 1955, the firm expanded into the San Fernando Valley by opening their first branch store in Burbank. A third store was opened in West Los Angeles in June 1957, followed by a fourth store in West Covina in August 1958. Stores built during this time period occupied 40,000 square feet of retail space.

The growth rate of the firm accelerated during the 1960s. In 1960, Akron opened both their fifth store in Torrance and sixth store in Anaheim. According to a 1961 article in the Los Angeles Times, Akron had eight stores in Los Angeles and San Francisco and was in the process of building a new headquarters building that was separate from the main store at that time. Unfortunately, the article does not mention how many stores were opened in the San Francisco area, or when. In early 1963, the chain replaced their original store on Sunset with a new larger building on the same property while still conducting business in the original building during the construction process. The original building was located on the southwest side of the property while the newer building was on the northeast side of the property.

In 1963, a store was opened in Los Angeles on Rodeo Place in the Crenshaw district and in Tarzana. A 1963 article in the Times called the Crenshaw store the ninth store in the chain.

The first mention of the Ventura-Oxnard store occurred in an ad in the September 1964 issue of the Times. The ad listed the addresses for nine stores in the Southern California marketing area, including its first location in Ventura County.

In 1966, 20,000 square feet was added to the two year-old West Los Angeles store to handle the increase of business. Later in the same year, a store was opened at the Northpoint Shopping Center in San Francisco. According to a 1966 article in the Times, this was the first store in San Francisco and the tenth in the chain. Store counts as reported in the Los Angeles Times during the mid-1960s are sometimes confusing since some articles appear to include the Northern California stores in their count while other articles do not.

In 1967, the firm's eleventh store opened in Pasadena and their fourteenth store the following year in Orange. A new service building was also constructed in Carson in 1968 to service all of the new locations. The fifteenth store was opened in Lakewood followed by another store in Monterey Park in 1969.

The first mention of the Bakersfield store occurred in an ad in the July 1970 issue of the Times. Two stores, the 17th and 18th in the chain, were opened later in 1970 in San Bernardino and Granada Hills. In early 1971, the company announced grandiose plans of adding 9 stores in new locations such as San Francisco, San Diego, and even out-of-state to their then current 18 locations. Many of these additions failed to materialize.

Two stores opened later 1971 at Mission Valley and La Mesa in the San Diego metropolitan area. An ad in the October 1971 issue of the Times that announced the opening of the San Diego stores also announced the remodeling and enlargement of the main store on Sunset and also mentions the expected opening of a store in Daly City the following month in the San Francisco Bay area. The ad also listed the addresses for 18 Southern Californian stores, but none of the Northern California stores were included.

The first mention of the store in Santa Barbara occurred in an ad in the August 1972 issue of the Times. The ad listed the addresses for 19 stores in the Southern California marketing area.

A hint that the firm was beginning to have cash flow problems occurred when it was announced that the firm had sold the real estate for three of its stores that it had owned in a 1972 sale leaseback scheme for its stores in Pasadena, Orange and Santa Clara (in the San Francisco Bay area).

As recorded in the news media at that time, 1974 was a very interesting year for the firm. There were at least 3 articles in the trade journal Women's Wear Daily concerning the privately held company. One article reported that the firm was doing well with increasing sales volumes during the 1970s recession. Another article reported that the three member executive team basically traded jobs with the president being appointed chairman, the vice-president/general manager/secretary appointed president, and the chairman appointed vice-president/secretary. This was the first change in leadership since the company was formed two decades earlier. A third article reported that company officials had denied rumors that the firm was in negotiations that might lead to the firm's purchase by Thrifty Drug Stores. By this time, the chain had 23 stores, all of which were located in California, and had started a fully owned subsidiary in the middle of the country called Columbus.

=== Outside ownership and the slow decline ===
After having trouble obtaining bank loans, The Akron announced in August 1975 that it had sold an 80% stake in the company to Jack A. Levin & Associates, which happened to be the company's largest supplier, while the three officers retained the remaining 20%. Jack Levin became chairman and CEO while Hadel was retained as president. Levin eventually increased his share in the company to 90%. Eight months later in April 1976, Levin sold a 40% interest in the company to Thrifty Drug Stores Company, Inc. and a 10% interest to Richard Ralphs, former CEO of Ralphs Grocery Company. Ralphs replaced Levin as chairman and CEO. A year later in March 1977, Thrifty increased their stake in Akron to 90% by purchasing the remaining 40% from Levin, 5% from president Richard Hadel, and 5% from Hadel's ex-wife. The only shares that Thrifty did not own at this time was the 10% owned by Ralphs, but Thrifty had an option purchase his shares anytime in the future. Under Thrifty, Hadel was retained as president until late 1977 or early 1978 when he had left to take a position at the Sunset House division of Carter Hawley Hale Stores. By October 1977, Akron had 23 stores and Columbus had 5 stores. At this time, Akron was still losing money, but not as much as before.

Although Akron was losing money, Thrifty still opened new stores in rapidly expanding areas of Southern California. In November 1977, a new store opened in Laguna Hills. According to a Los Angeles Times article, this store was the 23rd store in the chain, the 20th store in Southern California, and the third store in Orange County. Later during the same month, another store was opened in Sunland-Tujunga. A fourth store in Orange County was opened in Huntington Beach in March 1978. In September of the same year, Thrifty tried something new by opening a new Akron adjacent to a new Thrifty Drug Store in the same shopping center in Whittier. There is no record if this experiment had improved sales for either store.

To be closer to the headquarters of their corporate parent, Akron moved their corporate headquarters from Melrose Avenue to Wilshire Boulevard in August 1978. In November 1978, an announcement was made that Thrifty was selling 45% of the Akron to Pier 1. At the time of the sale, there was no information if Ralphs had still owned 10% of Akron. If that was true, then the 45% represented half of Thrifty's interest in Akron. There is also no information about Pier 1's involvement in Akron and if and when Pier 1 sold its shares back to Thrifty. At this point in time, Akron and Pier 1 carried very similar merchandise.

To replace Richard Hadel as president, Akron hired Donn Fletcher from Pier 1 as his replacement in June 1979. Fletcher shook up the company by closing unprofitable stores and changing the product mix. Clothing was eliminated. Instead of being known as the "serendipity" store in which the customer does not know what the store may carry on any particular visit, Akron tried to carry consistent goods that a customer could depend on being in the store during their next visit. The merchandise were also upgraded and made more similar to that carried by Pier 1.

In May 1980, Akron sold the ground lease for its Bakersfield store to RB Furniture. At a Thrifty Corp. shareholders meeting in January 1981, the president of Thrifty announced that they decided to keep Akron since Akron had shown a profit during the past few months. The unexpected death of CEO and chairman Richard Ralphs in August 1982 resulted in making Fletcher the senior executive in charge of Akron.

In December 1982, Thrifty sold Akron to a Hong Kong–based married couple, the owners of one of Akron's suppliers. At the time of the sale, the chain was down to 21 stores. The new owners' son, City of Industry–based Francis Chan was appointed chairman and chief executive officer. In July 1983, a new store was opened at the Anaheim Plaza Shopping Center, the fifth store in Orange County and would be the final store that would be opened by the chain. At the time of this store opening, there were 20 stores from Santa Barbara to San Diego. Apparently, all stores north of Santa Barbara had been closed by this time.

The chain was in dire straits by 1984 and the Chan family decided that they needed to close most of the stores with the goal of saving the remainder. In October 1984, Akron negotiated with Circuit City to sell the leases for up to 17 of its 20 stores. In February 1985, Akron told its employees, many of whom had been with the company for more than 20 years, to take a 50% cut and give up most of their fringe benefits in an attempt to keep the company operating. Many of the stores were closed by Spring 1985. There is no record of any stores remaining open beyond this point.

Beginning in November 1985, Circuit City entered Southern California by opening stores at 12 former Akron locations in addition to 3 non-Akron locations.

== Columbus ==
Columbus was a fully owned subsidiary chain that was created by Akron to sell imported decorator products to high income customers at significantly higher prices. While most Akron locations were in free-standing stores in high traffic areas, Columbus locations were sited almost exclusively in the most expensive shopping mall that could be found that usually included such stores as Neiman Marcus, Tiffany & Co., and Lord & Taylor. The first location opened in Houston, Texas at The Galleria in the early 1970s, followed by a second Houston location and stores in Dallas, Texas; Phoenix, Arizona; and Denver, Colorado. There were five Columbus stores by 1975. The last mention of the chain in The Times was in 1977. Coincidentally, the new chain also shared its name with an Ohio city.

== See also ==
- List of defunct department stores of the United States
- Building 19
- Cost Plus, Inc.
