= Ollie's Bargain Outlet =

American discount retail store

Ollie's Bargain Outlet Holdings, Inc.

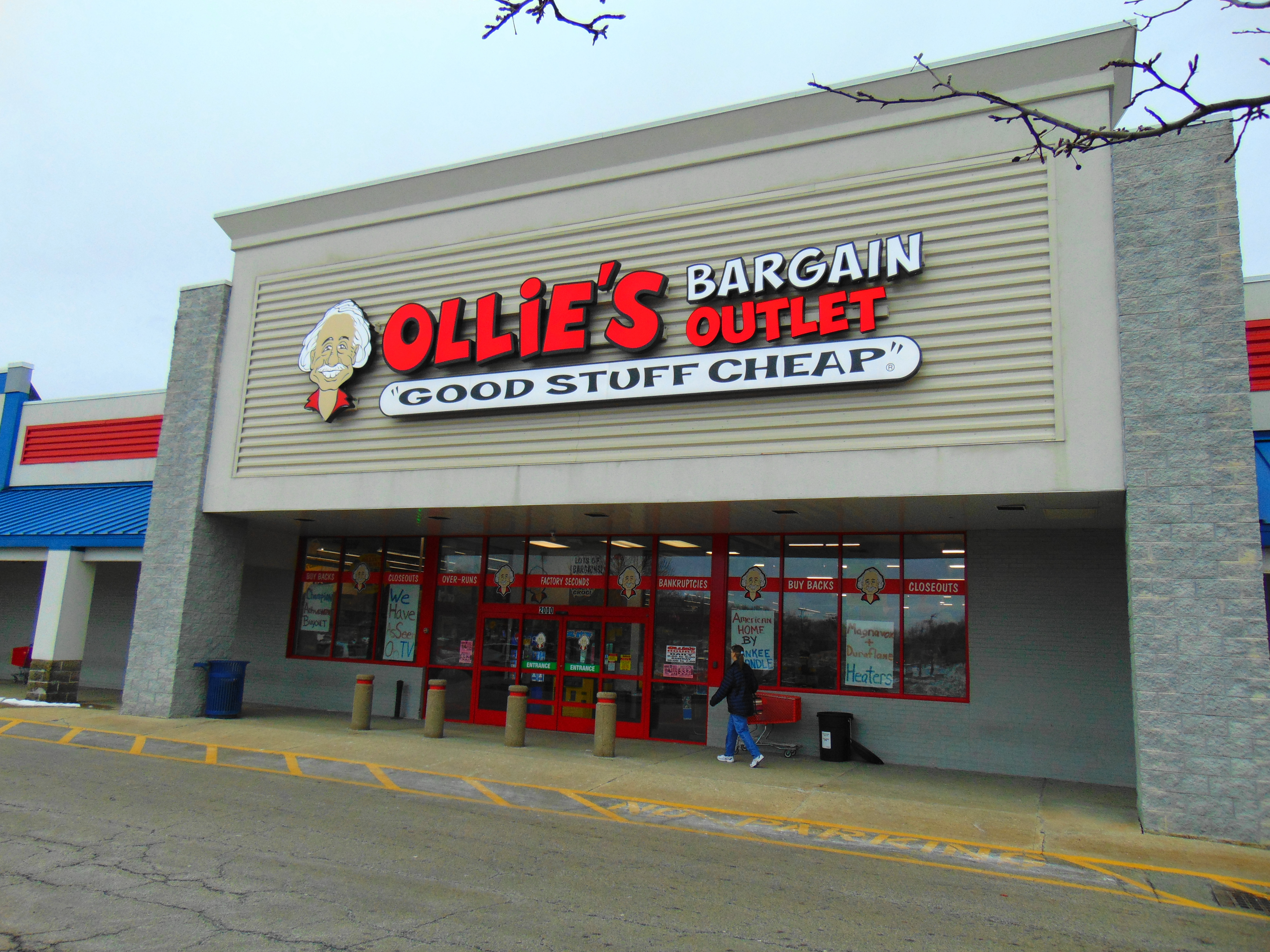
- An Ollie's Bargain Outlet in Woonsocket, Rhode Island
- Trade name: Ollie's Bargain Outlet
- Type: Public
- Traded as: Nasdaq: OLLI; S&P 400 component
- Industry: Discount retail
- Founded: July 29, 1982; 44 years ago in Mechanicsburg, Pennsylvania
- Founders: Mort Bernstein; Harry Coverman; Mark Butler; Oliver "Ollie" Rosenberg
- Headquarters: Harrisburg, Pennsylvania, U.S.
- Number of locations: 720
- Area served: United States
- Key people: Eric van der Valk (president, CEO); Chris Zender (executive vice president, COO); James Comitale (General counsel, senior vice president); Kevin McLain (senior vice president, general merchandise manager); Rob Helm (executive vice president, CFO); Larry Kraus (CIO)
- Products: Gifts, housewares, food, flooring, books, toys, hardware, electronics, clothing, lawn and garden, health and beauty, sporting goods, pet supplies, automotive, seasonal
- Brands: Various
- Revenue: ▲US$2.649 billion (2025)
- Net income: ▲US$241 million (2025)
- Number of employees: 12,792 (2025)
- Website: www.ollies.com

Ollie's Bargain Outlet is an American discount store chain. It was founded in Mechanicsburg, Pennsylvania, in 1982 by Morton Bernstein, Mark Butler, Harry Coverman, and Oliver "Ollie" Rosenberg, the company's namesake. As of September 2026, the chain has 694 locations in 35 states. Its selection of merchandise comprises a variety of discounted items, mostly overstock or closeout merchandise that is purchased in bulk from other retailers and sold at discounted prices. Ollie's Bargain Outlet stores feature advertisements and signage with caricatures of Rosenberg, and the chain's slogan "good stuff cheap."

== History ==
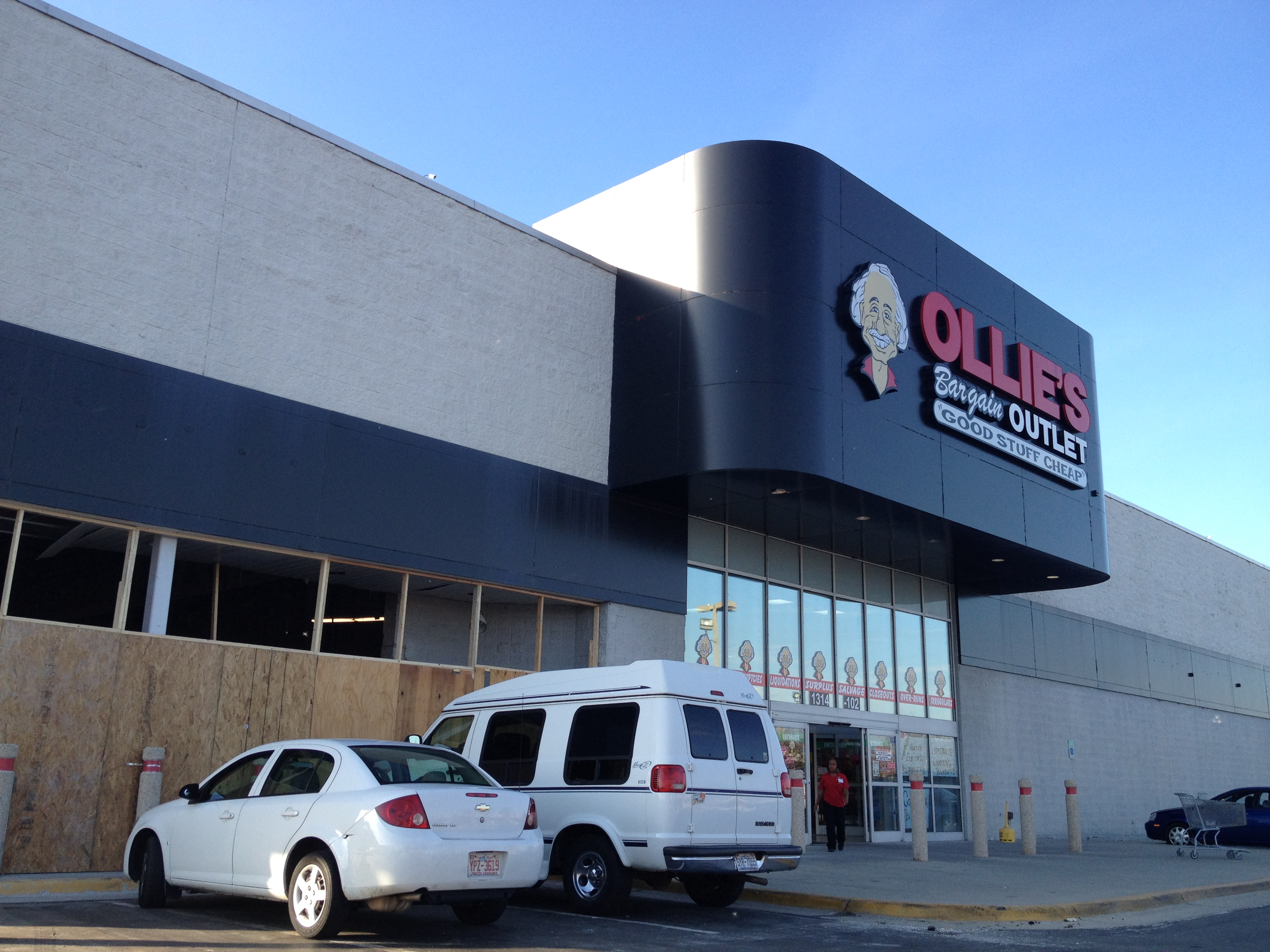
A former Circuit City that was turned into an Ollie's in Greensboro, North Carolina.

Ollie's Bargain Outlet was founded in 1982 in Mechanicsburg, Pennsylvania. Merchandiser Mort Bernstein owned a lumber yard called Lawrence Millwork, but was proving unsuccessful due to an unfavorable economy. While in Boston, Massachusetts, Bernstein visited Building 19, a local surplus store chain, and decided to create a similar store of his own. Through connections with local business owners Harry Coverman and Mark Butler, Bernstein presented his concept to business owner Oliver "Ollie" Rosenberg, who also visited Building 19 for himself and agreed to assist the others in the venture. He financed the opening of the first store and served as its namesake. The first Ollie's Bargain Outlet opened for business on July 29, 1982, in a former Lawrence Millwork location on Carlisle Pike (US 11) in Mechanicsburg. The initial store sold surplus and overstock items. The store began advertising itself with cartoon caricatures of Rosenberg drawn by various free-lance artists. These ads often feature handwritten lettering and puns or jokes, leading Rosenberg to compare them to a newspaper comic strip.

By 1987, Ollie's Bargain Outlet had opened two more stores: one in Lower Paxton Township, Pennsylvania, and a third in York, Pennsylvania. At the time, Rosenberg noted that all three stores were achieving approximately $1,000,000 in annual sales, typically by selling overstock and closeout items, as well as items acquired from other companies that had filed for bankruptcy. The Lower Paxton Township store relocated to a larger building in late 1988. In 1990, Ollie's opened its fourth location, taking a former Channel Home Centers location on the west side of York in West Manchester Township. This was followed two years later by a location in Brooklyn Park, Maryland, also in a former Channel Home Center. By this point, Coverman and Butler were respectively president and vice-president of the chain. The sixth and seventh stores, respectively located in Lancaster, Pennsylvania, and Dundalk, Maryland, both opened in early 1993. Rosenberg died of an aneurysm at age 75 on March 26, 1996.

=== 2000–onward: Continued growth ===
Despite Rosenberg's death, the chain continued to expand throughout Pennsylvania and Maryland, and opened its 20th location in Pottsville, Pennsylvania, in late 2000. Further growth ensued throughout the beginning of the 21st century; by February 2005, the chain had opened its 36th store and was reporting annual sales of $150,000,000. At the time, Butler was both president and chief executive officer of the company.

In 2008, the chain consolidated its four distribution warehouses into one located in York, Pennsylvania. In 2014, the chain opened its second distribution center in Commerce, Georgia.

On July 16, 2015, Ollie's began trading on Nasdaq under the stock symbol OLLI.

In 2017, Ollie's total sales exceeded $1 billion for the first time in the company's history.

In December 2019, Ollie's announced that John Swygert would become president and CEO of the company following the death of Mark Butler on December 1, 2019. Swygert had previously been executive vice president and chief operating officer of Ollie's since January 2018.

In 2021, overall net sales were reported and fell 3.1% to $1.753 billion.

In March 2025, Ollie's purchased 63 store leases from its competitor Big Lots following that chain's closure, with the intent to convert those locations to Ollie's stores by the end of 2025.

== Operations ==
The Ollie's Bargain Outlet business model involves purchasing merchandise directly from manufacturers and other retailers, in bulk and selling in smaller quantities to customers with the minimum operational and distribution costs; resulting in discounted products to be sold in Ollie's stores. The merchandise selection consists of a variety of manufacturer's overruns, overstocks and packaging changes, as well as selected other products. The company is especially focused on buying and selling closeouts. The chain's slogan is "good stuff cheap".

== Other ventures ==
In 2004, Ollie's Bargain Outlet became a sponsor of NASCAR driver Dave Blaney.

The Ollie's Cares Charitable Foundation has been supporting a number of philanthropic causes, including the following national organizations regularly and in significant ways through store events and other means: Cal Ripken, Sr. Foundation, Kevin Harvick Foundation, Feeding America, Toys for Tots, and Children's Miracle Network Hospitals. Ollie's Bargain Outlet raises more than $2,000,000 a year for these organizations combined.
