= Overstock =

Excessive inventory

Overstock, excessive stock, or excess inventory arise when there is more than the "right quantity" of goods available for sale, or when "the potential sales value of excess stock, less the expected storage costs, does not match the salvage value". It arises as a result of poor management of stock demand or of material flow in process management. Excessive stock is also associated with loss of revenue owing to additional capital bound with the purchase or simply storage space taken. Excessive stock can result from over delivery from a supplier or from poor ordering and management of stock by a buyer for the stock. Excess or unnecessary inventory is listed as one of the seven wastes or "muda" in Taiichi Ohno's Toyota production system.

When referring to overstock merchandise in the form of consumer goods in a retail operation, the term refers to goods that have never been purchased by a customer but that are considered excessive stock from shelves and/or warehouses. Excessive stock is typically discarded of in the following ways: returned to the manufacturer or original distributor; liquidated to companies that then resell it on the secondary wholesale or retail market; sold at an extreme discount to existing customers; or sold to salvage companies which then process metals and components of value.

Techniques such as supply chain management and lean manufacturing are intended to avoid the excessive development of inventory.

== Economic implications ==
The initial damage caused by excessive stock is an early exhaustion of cash flow, which leads to the subsequent loss of disposable capital available for investing. If a company has too much overstock inventory on its books, it may affect sales to the point where the company has to go out of business. Although this is rare, when overstock inventory is not properly managed and becomes too large a percentage of total inventory, it can result in bankruptcy.

With perishable supplies, excessive stock can cause the loss of millions of currency units as the product's freshness may deteriorate to such an extent that it cannot be sold, as is the case with dairy products, fresh baked goods, flowers, produce, fish, and meat. It is also true of consumables such as oil, gasoline, paints, and medications. Time-sensitive items such as periodical literature are similarly at risk.

== Sales of excess inventories ==
Crandall and Crandall reported 238,000 responses to a web search for "excess inventories" in 2003, with a majority of websites offering to buy or sell "excess inventories" in specific sales categories.

== See also ==
- Inventory
- Inventory control system
- Inventory management software
- Military surplus
- Operations management
- Supply chain management
- Warehouse management system
