= Ground Round =

American restaurant chain

The Ground Round
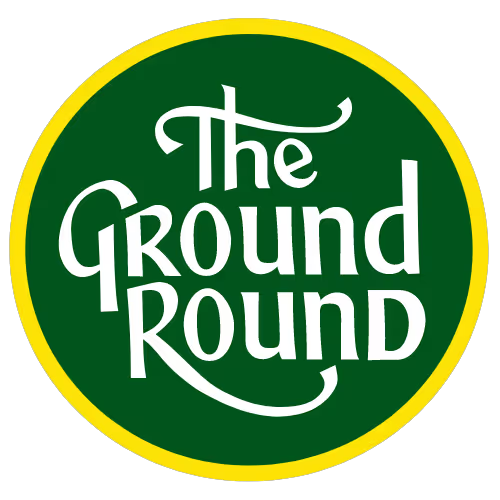
- Type: Casual dining restaurant
- Industry: Restaurants
- Founded: October 25, 1969
- Number of locations: 3 (2026)
- Owner: Joseph and Nachi Shea

The Ground Round is an American casual dining restaurant chain that was founded in 1969 in Massachusetts by Howard Johnson's. Originally intended as a secondary concept to upgrade poorly performing units of Howard Johnson's, it also operated on a standalone basis and became a major growth focus for Howard Johnson after the 1973 oil crisis hurt its other concepts. By 1985, when Ground Round was separated from Howard Johnson, it had 215 restaurants.

In the late 1980s and 1990s, Ground Round suffered from an outdated image compared to other casual dining competitors such as Chili's and Applebee's, an overly large menu, and debt from multiple sales that diminished the chain's ability to invest in restaurant remodels and other initiatives. Boston Ventures Management acquired Ground Round in 1997 but struggled from delayed sales of corporate locations and a refranchising effort that left the company-owned stores underperforming franchised units.

After filing for Chapter 11 bankruptcy protection in 2004, the chain closed some 60 corporate-owned locations. Ground Round Independent Owners Cooperative, LLC—a group originally formed of franchise owners based in Freeport, Maine—bought the chain out of bankruptcy, at which time it had 71 locations. The unit count has continued to dwindle since then. As of July 2026, the company operates 3 locations in Massachusetts, North Dakota, and Ohio.

== History ==
Ground Round was founded in 1969 by Howard Johnson's as a chain of pubs with a simple menu. It was intended as a new concept to convert marginal Howard Johnson's locations, as well as existing restaurant facilities. After the 1973 oil crisis, Ground Round became the primary expansion target within the company as it was forced to shift from long-distance travelers to local residents; by 1975, there were 64 Ground Round units, surpassing the Red Coach Grill concept. During the 1970s and 1980s, Ground Round was well-known for its children's parties, showing silent movies and cartoons on a big screen, a mascot named Bingo the Clown, and for passing out peanuts, whose shells customers could just drop on the floor.

Ground Round had four owners in a 22-year span; Imperial Group retained Ground Round when Howard Johnson was sold to the Marriott Corporation in 1985, and its headquarters moved in the Boston area from North Quincy to Weymouth. Hanson Group USA purchased Imperial in 1986; three years later, International Proteins Corporation acquired Ground Round for $93 million, at which time the restaurant chain had 215 locations (178 corporate-owned). In the meantime, the once-simple menu had grown to over 200 items, the chain had failed to keep up with the times, the buildings and their decor were outdated, and the restaurant saw its market share drop. The menu size increases, which included such dishes as swordfish and Mexican pizza, stemmed in part from attempts to diversify a menu heavy on meat dishes. Competitors such as Chili's and Applebee's siphoned market share; in 1994, the 207-unit system implemented its first-ever image advertising campaign as well as a restaurant remodeling plan. The constant changes in ownership caused money that otherwise might have gone to updating restaurants to be diverted to debt payments. Such chain staples as peanuts and free popcorn were scrapped or scaled back in attempts to modernize.

After sales slowed in the casual-dining segment and Chili's and Applebee's were able to invest more in advertising, it was acquired by Boston Ventures Management in 1997; two years prior, a merger with a group of senior investors fell through due to high interest rates. The privatization of the previously publicly traded Ground Round increased its debt burden. In spite of a 2000 relaunch with a new prototype and a slimming down of the menu from 300 items to 80, the company struggled after sales of 19 company-owned units fell through, causing it to default on loan payments. Refranchising attempts left corporate with the worst performers in the chain.

=== Bankruptcy and cooperative ownership ===
On February 13, 2004, Foothill Capital Management and Boston Ventures Management terminated their credit facilities for the chain. That day, all corporate-owned restaurants, almost half of the Ground Rounds then open, abruptly closed their doors. The franchisor for Ground Round, American Hospitality Concepts, filed for Chapter 11 bankruptcy on February 19. Nation's Restaurant News reported that "the mass layoffs and hasty restaurant lockups on that Friday afternoon, catching scores of diners in the middle of unfinished meals, were of a scale not seen in the restaurant industry in recent memory" and franchise owners were equally as taken aback by the news. While franchised stores—which on the whole were higher-performing than corporate locations—remained open, sales fell as confused consumers assumed all restaurants had closed. A group of franchisees bought out the company and started the Ground Round Independent Owners Cooperative, LLC. They beat out U.S. Residential Properties, a Dallas-based real estate investment trust, by agreeing to settle $40 million in cure claims. After the bankruptcy, Ground Round emerged as a 71-unit system, with 64 restaurants part of the cooperative and seven owned by other franchisees.

In 2011, the Independent Owners Cooperative paid down its remaining loans from the 2004 acquisition. A new location opened in 2012 in New Jersey attached to a 26-lane bowling alley. There were 27 units by 2013, when the company declared its interest in expanding outside the chain's traditional base. Most of the remaining units were clustered in the Upper Midwest and Northeast. There were 15 units by 2021, when Ground Round launched another attempt to grow its market share with a beer-focused concept to open inside a Best Western hotel in Waterloo, Iowa. Locations from Missouri to New York state have closed as independent restaurateurs retire or sell the buildings.

By August 2024, there were three Ground Rounds in the U.S.; two in North Dakota and one in Ohio. By that year, Joseph and Nachi Shea acquired the rights to the Ground Round name, with the existing locations continuing as licensed units, and announced plans to open a new location in Shrewsbury, Massachusetts, which opened in January 2025, bringing the amount of total locations to four. A previous location there operated until 2004, and Joseph Shea often visited it as a child. The restaurant announced it would pass out popcorn instead of peanuts due to allergy and fire code regulations.
