= List of Rhode Island companies =

The following list of Rhode Island companies includes notable companies that are, or once were, headquartered in Rhode Island.

== Companies based in Rhode Island ==
=== A ===
- A. T. Cross Company
- Alex and Ani
- Aloha Partners
- American Tourister
- Amica Mutual Insurance
- Ann & Hope
- APC by Schneider Electric
- The Apex Companies
- Arpin Group

=== B ===
- Bess Eaton
- Big Blue Bug Solutions
- Breeze Publications

=== C ===
- Cavanagh Company
- Citizens Financial Group
- Coastal Extreme Brewing Company
- CVS Health
- CVS Pharmacy

=== D ===
- Daniele, Inc.
- Deepwater Wind

=== F ===
- FM Global
- Foolproof Brewing Company

=== G ===
- Gilbane Building Company
- Gray's General Store

=== H ===
- Hamilton House
- Hasbro
- Hindley Manufacturing
- Howes Lubricator

=== I ===
- ION Audio

=== M ===
- Moran Shipping Agencies

=== N ===
- Nail Communications
- Narragansett Brewing Company
- Nautic Partners
- New England Airlines
- Newport Creamery

=== O ===
- Ocean State Job Lot

=== P ===
- Playskool
- Providence Equity Partners

=== R ===
- RISN Operations

=== S ===
- Simulia
- Southside Community Land Trust
- Swarovski North America Ltd.

=== T ===
- Textron
- Towerstream

=== U ===
- United Natural Foods
- Upserve

== Companies formerly based in Rhode Island ==
=== 0–9 ===
- 38 Studios

=== A ===
- Amperex Electronic
- Ando Media
- Armington & Sims Engine Company

=== B ===
- Benny's

=== C ===
- Ceco Manufacturing Company

=== D ===
- Dieges & Clust
- Displays2Go

=== E ===
- Eckerd Corporation

=== F ===
- Fruit of the Loom

=== G ===
- Global Broadcasting
- GreenBytes
- GTECH Corporation

=== M ===
- Manpacks
- Martin & Hall

=== O ===
- The Outlet Company

=== R ===
- Rhode Island Soft Systems

=== S ===
- Smith Granite Company
- Stone, Carpenter & Willson

=== T ===
- Tillinghast Licht

=== W ===
- Walsh-Kaiser Company
- William R. Walker & Son

=== Z ===
- Zeo, Inc.
