= Arpin =

Arpin may refer to:

== People ==
- John Arpin (1936–2007), Canadian composer and musician
- Marie Luc Arpin (born 1978), Canadian water polo player
- Michel Arpin (1935–2015), French alpine skier
- Odo Arpin of Bourges (c. 1060–c. 1130), French medieval crusader
- Paul Arpin (born 1960), French long-distance runner
- René Arpin (born 1943), French biathlete
- Roland Arpin (1934–2010), Canadian educator and public administrator
- Steve Arpin (born 1983), Canadian race car driver

== Places ==
- Arpin (town), Wisconsin, US
  - Arpin, Wisconsin, a village in the town
- Lake Arpin, a lake in Quebec, Canada

== Other uses ==
- Actin related protein 2/3 complex inhibitor, encoded by the ARPIN gene
- Arpin Group, an American moving and storage company
- M. B. Arpin & Co., a British aircraft manufacturer

== See also ==
- Arpine, a given name
- Arpino (disambiguation)
