= Hindley (surname) =

Hindley is a surname. Notable people with the surname include:

- Becky Hindley (born 1965), English television, stage and radio actress
- Brian Hindley (born 1944), English rugby league footballer
- Charles Hindley (disambiguation), several people
- Clement Hindley (1874–1944), British railway engineer
- Everett Hindley, Canadian politician
- Frank Hindley (1915–2003), English footballer
- Gary Hindley (born 1947), American soccer coach
- Henry Hindley (1701–1771), English clockmaker
- J. Roger Hindley, British logician
- Jai Hindley (born 1996), Australian professional cyclist
- Jeremy Hindley (1944–2013), English horse trainer
- John Hindley, 1st Viscount Hyndley (1883–1963), British businessman
- Matthew Hindley (born 1974), South African artist
- Michael Hindley (born 11 April 1947), British politician
- Myra Hindley (1942–2002), English serial killer
- Peter Hindley (1944–2021), English footballer
- Rachel Hindley (born 1981), New Zealand badminton player
- Reg Hindley (1914–1972), British equestrian
- Richard Hindley (born 1975), English cricketer
- William Hindley (1853–1936), Australian Anglican archdeacon

== See also ==
- Hindley Earnshaw, fictional character
