= Hindley =

Hindley may refer to:

== Places ==
- Hindley, Greater Manchester, England
  - Hindley (ward), an electoral ward of the Wigan Metropolitan Borough Council
- Hindley, Northumberland, England

== Other uses ==
- Hindley (surname)
- Hindley Manufacturing, American wire-hardware manufacturer
- Hindley School, school in the US
- HM Prison Hindley, prison in England
- Hindley Street, in Adelaide, South Australia
