= Arpine =

Arpine is a feminine given name in the Armenian language that holds the meaning of "sun".

== Notable people with the given name ==
- Arpine Gabrielyan (born 1989), Armenian broadcaster, model, singer and actress
- Arpine Hovhannisyan (born 1983), Armenian politician
- Arpine Pehlivanian (1934–2004), Armenian-American classical singer
- Arpine Martoyan (born 2007), Armenian singer and songwriter

== See also ==
- Arpino (disambiguation)
- Lapine (disambiguation)
