= George Pehlivanian =

French-American conductor of Lebanese Armenian origin

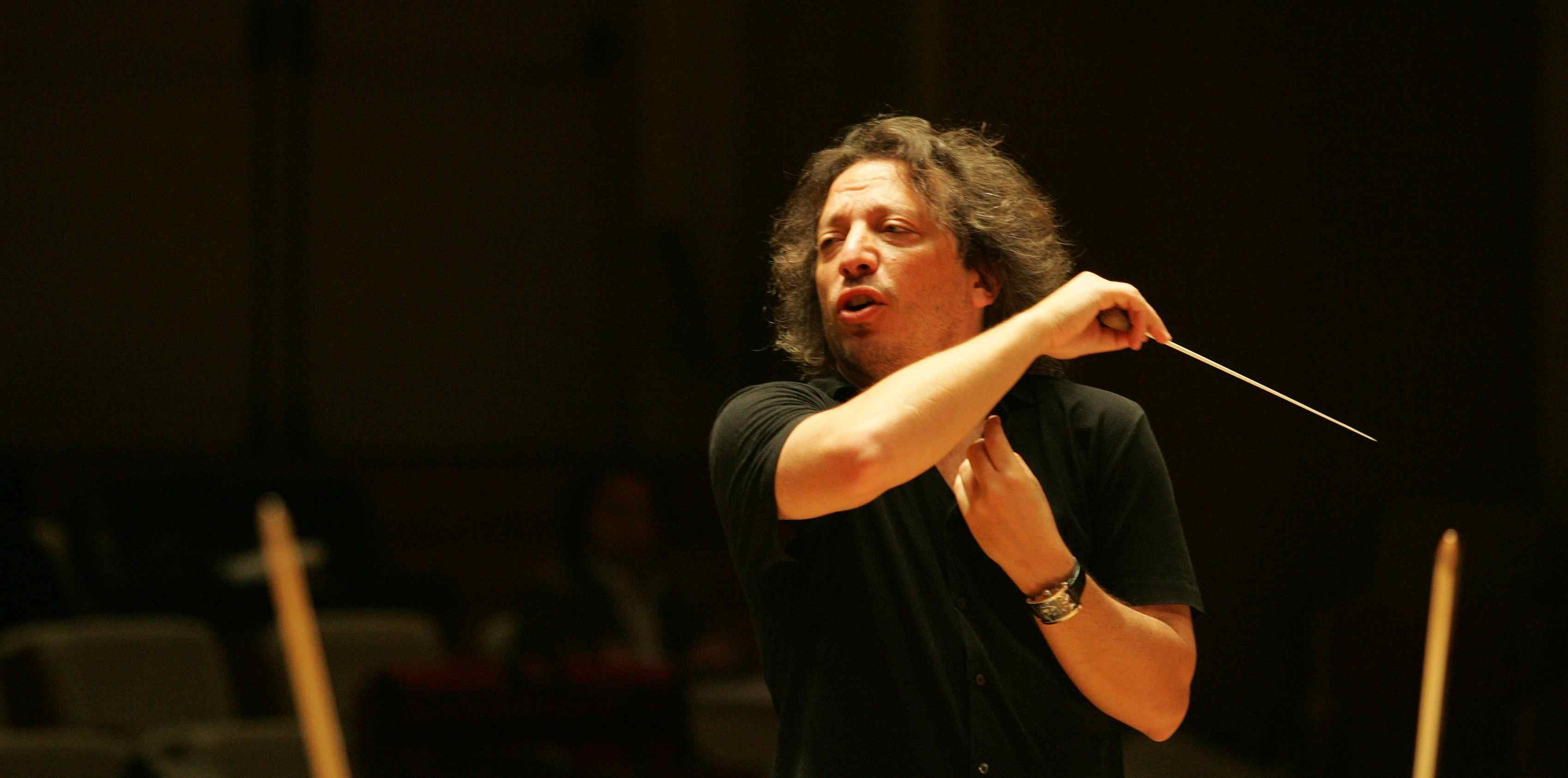

George Pehlivanian (born 20 April 1964) is a French-American conductor.

== Biography ==
George Pehlivanian ia a French-American conductor, born in Beirut, Lebanon, into a musical family of Armenian origin. His mother, Arpine Pehlivanian, is a Lebanese Armenian classical coloratura soprano singer who fled Lebanon during the Lebanese Civil War. Pehlivanian studied violin and piano from an early age. He emigrated to Los Angeles in 1975, and worked as a violinist before studying conducting with Pierre Boulez, Lorin Maazel, and Ferdinand Leitner. Pehlivanian also attended the Accademia Musicale Chigiana in Italy.

In 1991 he became the first American to win the Grand Prize in the history of the Besançon International Conductors' Competition in France. From 2005 until 2008 he was the first foreign Chief Conductor of the Slovenian Philharmonic Orchestra, and in 2007 he became Principal Guest Conductor at the Opera Theatre of Cagliari in Sardinia, Italy. He remained Principal Guest Conductor of the Deutsche Staatsphilharmonie RheinlandPfalz from 2002–12. He also held Principal Guest conducting positions with the Residentie Orchestra in The Hague and the Vienna Chamber Orchestra. He enjoys a long-standing relationship with the Spanish National Orchestra since 1996, and recorded works by Rodrigo with the orchestra.

In June 2014, Pehlivanian was bestowed with the 'Golden Medal' from the Ministry of Culture of Armenia, the highest possible honor given to an artist by the Armenian government. From 2012, Pehlivanian has accepted to become Professor of Orchestral Conducting at the Conservatoire National Superieur de Music et Danse de Paris, and was bestowed with the title of Honorary Director and Consultant of Music Education of the Communidad de Madrid. In 2010, he became Artistic Director and Founder of the Touquet International Music Masters Festival in Le Touquet, France, very successful and developing rapidly as one of the world's top festivals for young artists today.

Pehlivanian has conducted many of the world's most famous orchestras, such as the London Philharmonic Orchestra, London Philharmonia, Orchestra della Scala, the Leipzig Gewandhaus Orchestra, the NDR Hamburg Symphony, Orchestra dell'Accademia Nazionale di Santa Cecilia, the Israel Philharmonic, the Czech Philharmonic, Bamberger Symphoniker, Maggio Musicale Fiorentino, the Norddeutsche, Hessische and Sudwestdeutsche Runfunk Symphony Orchestras, Teatro Massimo di Palermo, Orchestra Teatro San Carlo di Napoli, Rotterdam Philharmonic Orchestra, l'Orchestre Philharmonique de Radio France, Monte-Carlo Philharmonic Orchestra, Orchestra della RAI Torino, Bournemouth Symphony, Orchestre National du Capitole de Toulouse, Orquesta Nacional de Espana, Orquesta Radio Television de Espana, the Opera and Symphony Orchestras of Valencia, Scottish National Orchestra, BBC Philharmonic, National Orchestra of Belgium, Qatar Philharmonic, and Orchestre de la Suisse Romande.

In North America, Pehlivanian has conducted the Baltimore, Houston, Cincinnati, Indianapolis, St.Paul, Rochester, Buffalo, Pacific, Honolulu, Puerto Rico as well as all the major Canadian Orchestras including Montreal, Toronto, Vancouver and Ottawa. Elsewhere, he has worked with the Russian National Orchestra, the Mariinsky Theatre, Russian National Orchestra, Moscow Philharmonic, Moscow Radio and Television Orchestra, Sydney, Perth and Brisbane Orchestras, Japan Virtuoso Symphony, the Malaysian, Hong Kong, Shanghai Philharmonic Orchestra, and a historical invitation as the first Armenian origin artist to lead the Turkish Presidential Symphony Orchestra in Ankara. He has collaborated with world class soloists such as Leonidas Kavakos, Vadim Repin, Joshua Bell, Janine Jansen, Gidon Kremer, Gil Shaham, Sarah Chang, Jean Yves Thibaudet, Emanuel Ax, Arcadi Volodos, Andre Watts, Mischa Maisky, Lynn Harell, Ofra Harnoy, Maurice Andre, Hakan Hardenberger, Evelyn Glennie, Ferrucio Furlanetto, Mirella Freni, Ruggero Raimondi, Leo Nucci, Dmitry Hrovstovsky, Leona Mitchel, Denyce Graves, Mariana Lipovsek, Bernarda Fink, and Vladimir Galuzin.

Very much at home in the operatic world as in the symphonic, Pehlivanian is regularly invited in prestigious opera houses around the world. He has led critically acclaimed performances of titles such as La Traviata, the Netherlands premier of "Riders to the Sea" of Vaughan Williams, Poulenc's "La Voix Humaine" at the Cite de la Musique in Paris, "Tosca" with the Theatre de Bordeaux, his Italian Lyrical debut with "Otello" in the San Carlo Opera of Napoli, which led to numerous productions including "Cavalleria Rusticana", "Gianni Schicchi" and "La Damnation de Faust", "Pique Dame" and "Andrea Chenier" with the Cagliari Opera House in Sardenia, "La Damnation de Faust" in the Teatro Regio di Parma for the Verdi Festival, continuous numerous productions with the New Israeli Opera House including, "Barbiere di Siviglia", "Ernani" and "Jenufa", the world premiere of " Le Jour des Meurtres de Hamlet" by Thilloy and recently a new production of "Boris Godunov" at Teatro di Massimo di Palermo. Mto. Pehlivanian also gave the Opera Premiere of a new production, "Sette Storie per Lasciare il Mondo", composed by Marco Betta and directed by Roberto Ando, at the Teatro Massimo de Palermo.

Pehlivanian has conducted in many important festivals including the closing concert of the White Nights Festival in St. Petersburg, Aix en Provence, Maggio Musicale Fiorentino, Ravenna, Ravello, Aspen, Ljubljana, Jeuness Musicale Vienna, Parma Verdi, Grenada, San Sebastien, Santander, El Escorial, Mito Milan, Lugano, Cannes MIDEM, Osaka, and Kyoto.

Pehlivanian has recorded for Virgin Classics/EMI, CHANDOS, Studios SM, BMG, music of Christian Jost for Coviello.

His next release is coming soon with the JONDE, Better known as the Joven Orquesta Nacional de España, with the 'Leningrad' Symphony of Shostakovich for the IBS Classical label.
