= Middlesex Middle School =

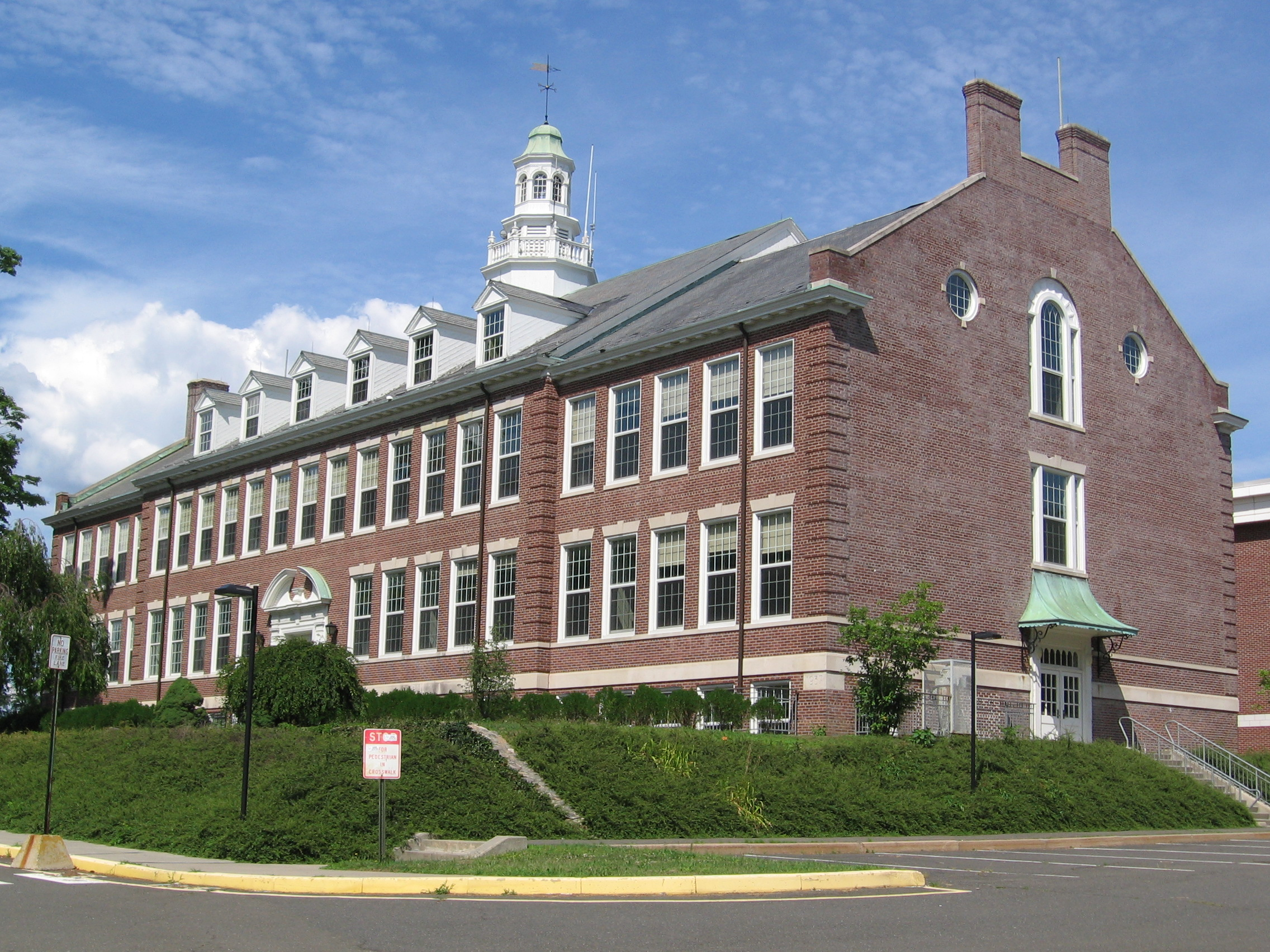
- Original part of Middlesex Middle School

Location
- Darien, Connecticut; United States; 41.0733°N 73.4971°W

Information
- Type: Public secondary
- School district: Darien Public Schools
- Principal: Kate Dimoulas, Tim Monahan, Felicia Bellows, Caitlin O'Keefe
- Grades: 6 - 8
- Enrollment: 1123
- Colors: Blue and white
- Mascot: Dragon
- Nickname: Riptide
- Website: https://mms.darienps.org

Middlesex Middle School is a middle school in the Darien Public Schools district in Darien, Connecticut, United States. The school is the highest point in the town, with an architectural height of 90 feet (27 M).

== History ==
The 1937 school building, a brick Colonial Revival structure, sits on a 27.34-acre (110,600 m^{2}) site at 204 Hollow Tree Ridge Road. The building underwent a major, $27 million addition and renovation in the late 1990s, which was completed in 2000.

In 1983, Middlesex was changed from a junior high school to a middle school. The ninth grade was transferred at that point to Darien High School.

Since 2005, the school district has been gradually equipping the school with air conditioning.

== Curriculum ==
Middlesex offers STEM, art, healthy living and computer courses as part of its curriculum.

== Extracurricular activities ==
Middlesex is the highest performing school for the National Geography Bee in Connecticut. In twenty-four of those years MMS' own geography bee champions have qualified for the statewide rounds and took the state championship in 1989, 2005, 2006, 2011, 2012, 2013, 2014, and 2018-representing Connecticut eight times at nationals.

On April 20, 2016, Middlesex was the chosen site for the National History Bee's Bridgeport Regional Finals. In 2016, Middlesex's quiz bowl team also won national championship titles at both the inaugural US Academic Bowl National Championships, and the Middle School National Championship Tournament organized by NAQT.

The 2013 yearbook (Tidings) entitled "Facts + Figures" received a Gold Medal critique from the Columbia Scholastic Press Association and a 2014 Gold Crown from CSPA.

== Awards and recognition ==
Middlesex was selected as a National Blue Ribbon School but, according to former principal Shelley Somers, the Blue Ribbon "blew down in a storm" in September 2017.

Middlesex donates to various charity organizations such as UNICEF. The school was a nationwide leading contributor to UNICEF for 2004 to 2006, based on its size. A daffodil drive is held every year to help raise money for cancer. In May 2006, American Idol runner-up Clay Aiken made a surprise visit to the school in gratitude for its UNICEF contributions of $14,000 that year.

In February 2007, Middlesex's MathCounts team won first prize in the South-Western CT MathCounts competition, while the team captain, 8th grade student Michael Kushnir won the individual first prize. The team went on to Connecticut's statewide MathCounts competition and won second place, yielding to perennial champion Hopkins School. Kushnir advanced to the second round and won the individual second place prize.

In the school year of 2007-2008, the school helped Good Morning America's coat drive, and also held a coat drive of their own.

== Pictures ==
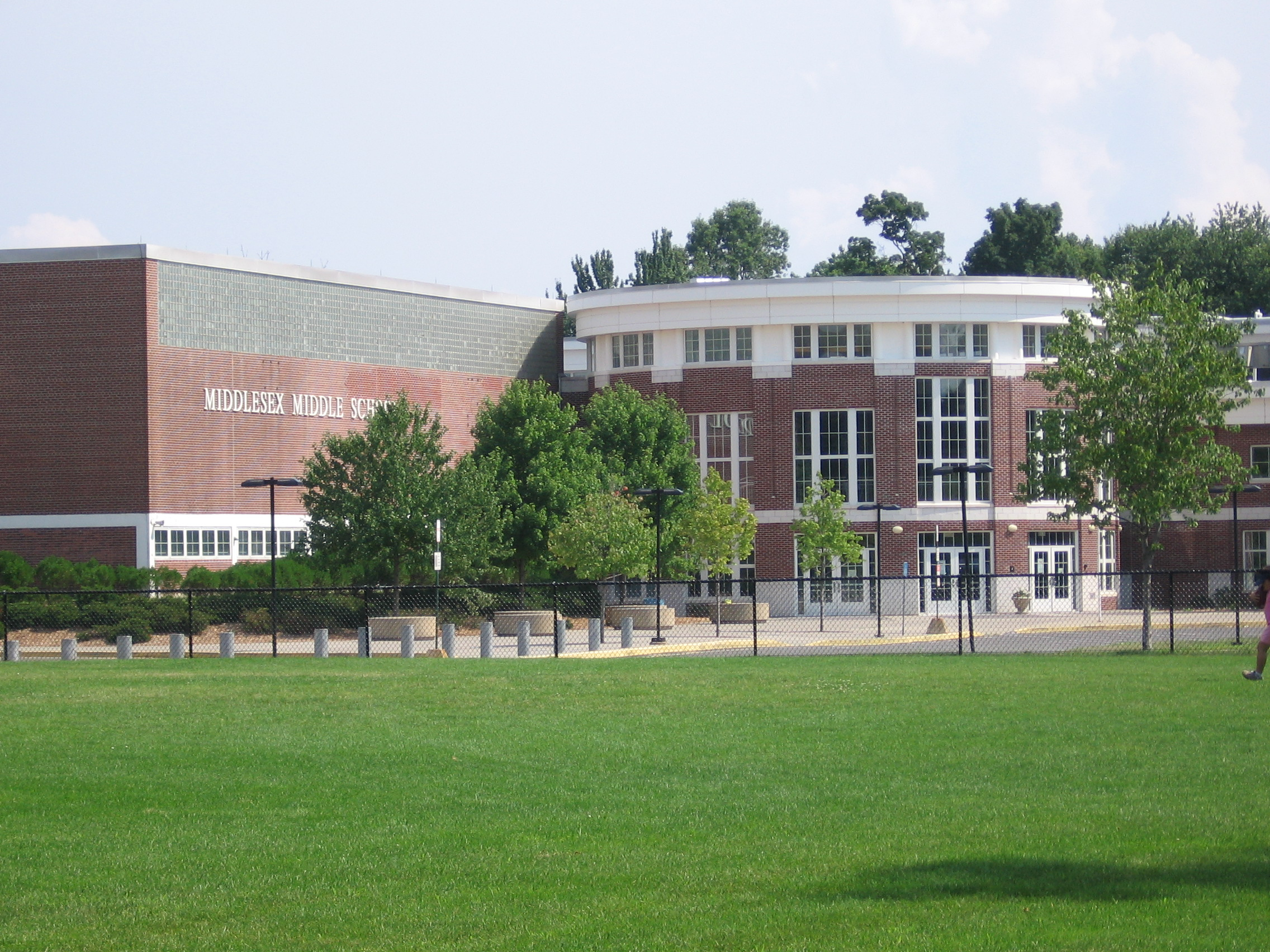
Entrance

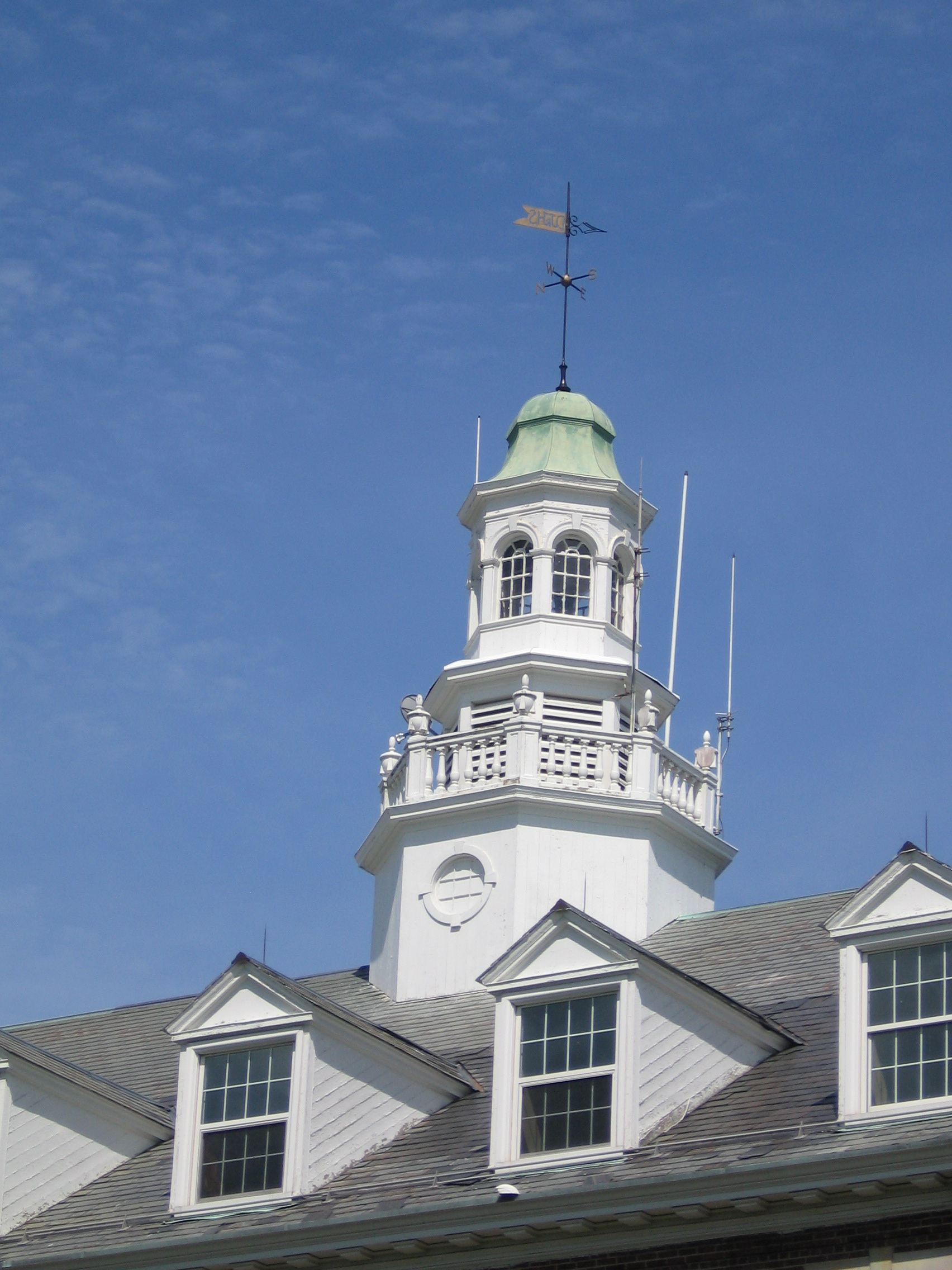
The cupola can be seen from I-95 and has antennae behind it.

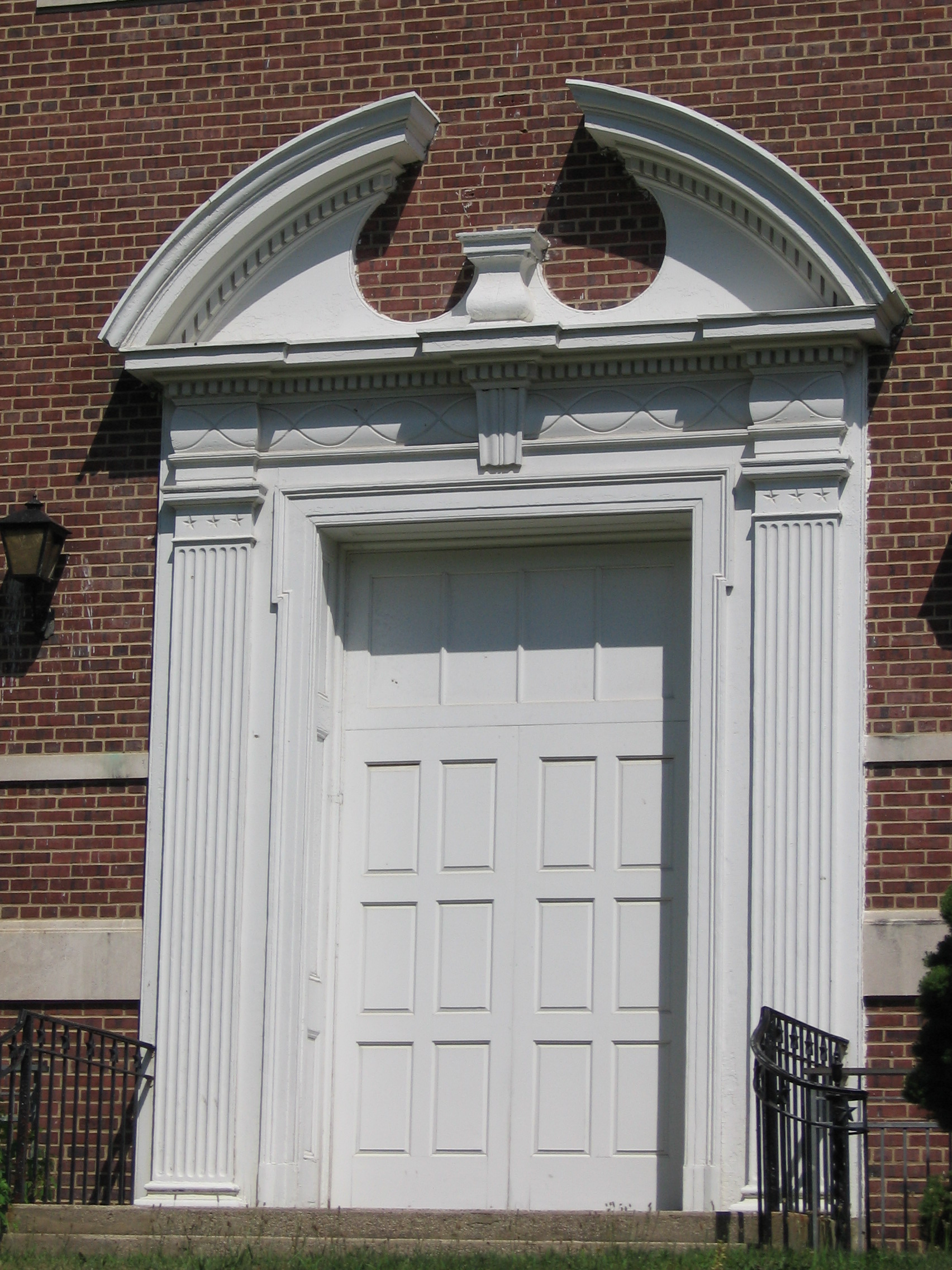
Former front door
