= Darien Public Schools =

School district in Connecticut, United States

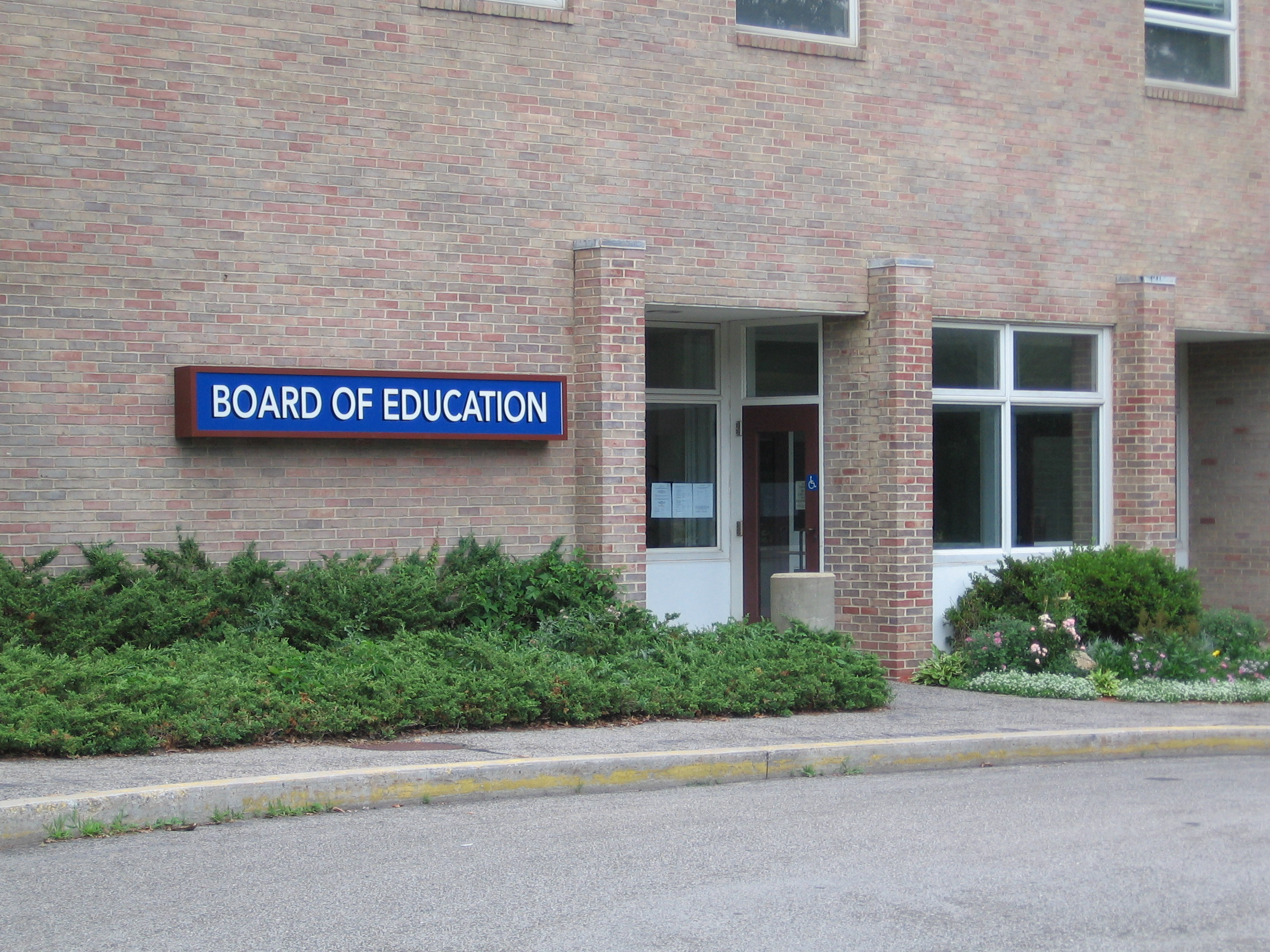
- Board of Education offices facing the lower parking lot, Town Hall

Address
- 35 Leroy Avenue Darien, Connecticut 06820 United States

District information
- Type: Public
- Grades: PK–12
- Superintendent: Alan Addley
- Schools: 7
- NCES District ID: 0901050

Students and staff
- Students: 4,681 (2023–24)
- Teachers: 422.54 (on an FTE basis)
- Student–teacher ratio: 11.08

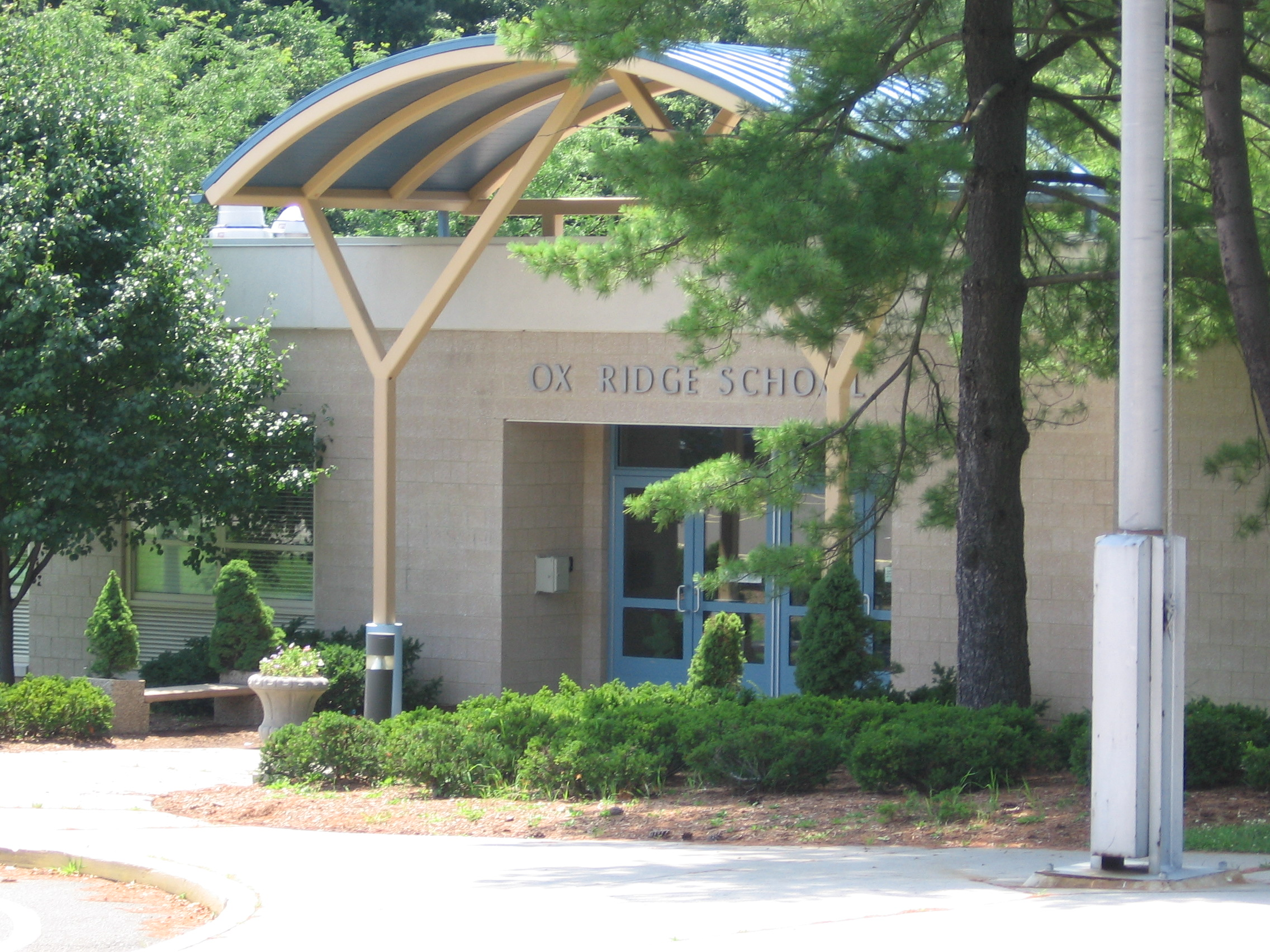
Entrance, Ox Ridge School

Darien Public Schools is a school district headquartered in Darien, Connecticut, United States. The district has seven schools.

The many members of the Board of Education in Darien are part of the Darien town government, and the total school budget must be approved by the town Board of Finance and Representative Town Meeting, although the Board of Education has ultimate control over how its town-appropriated budget is spent and their website is darienps.org.

The town has five elementary schools: Hindley School, Holmes School, Ox Ridge School, Royle School, and Tokeneke School. A $27 million addition was completed in 2000 to the town's middle school, Middlesex Middle School, and a new $73 million campus for Darien High School was completed in the fall of 2005.

== Students ==
Measurement	Year	Darien	DRG	State
Eligible for free/reduced price meals	2005-06	1.2%	1.1%	26.9%
Eligible for free/reduced price meals	2002-03	1.1%	n/a	25.4%
Non-English language at home	2005-06	3.0%	2.5%	12.6%
Non-English language at home	2000-01	3.9%	n/a/	12.5%

"DRG" (District Reference Group) — "A DRG is a classification of districts whose students' families are similar in education, income, occupation, and need, and have roughly similar enrollment."

== Schools ==
=== High school ===
- Darien High School

=== Middle school ===
- Middlesex Middle School

=== Elementary schools ===
- Hindley Elementary School
- Holmes Elementary School
- Ox Ridge School

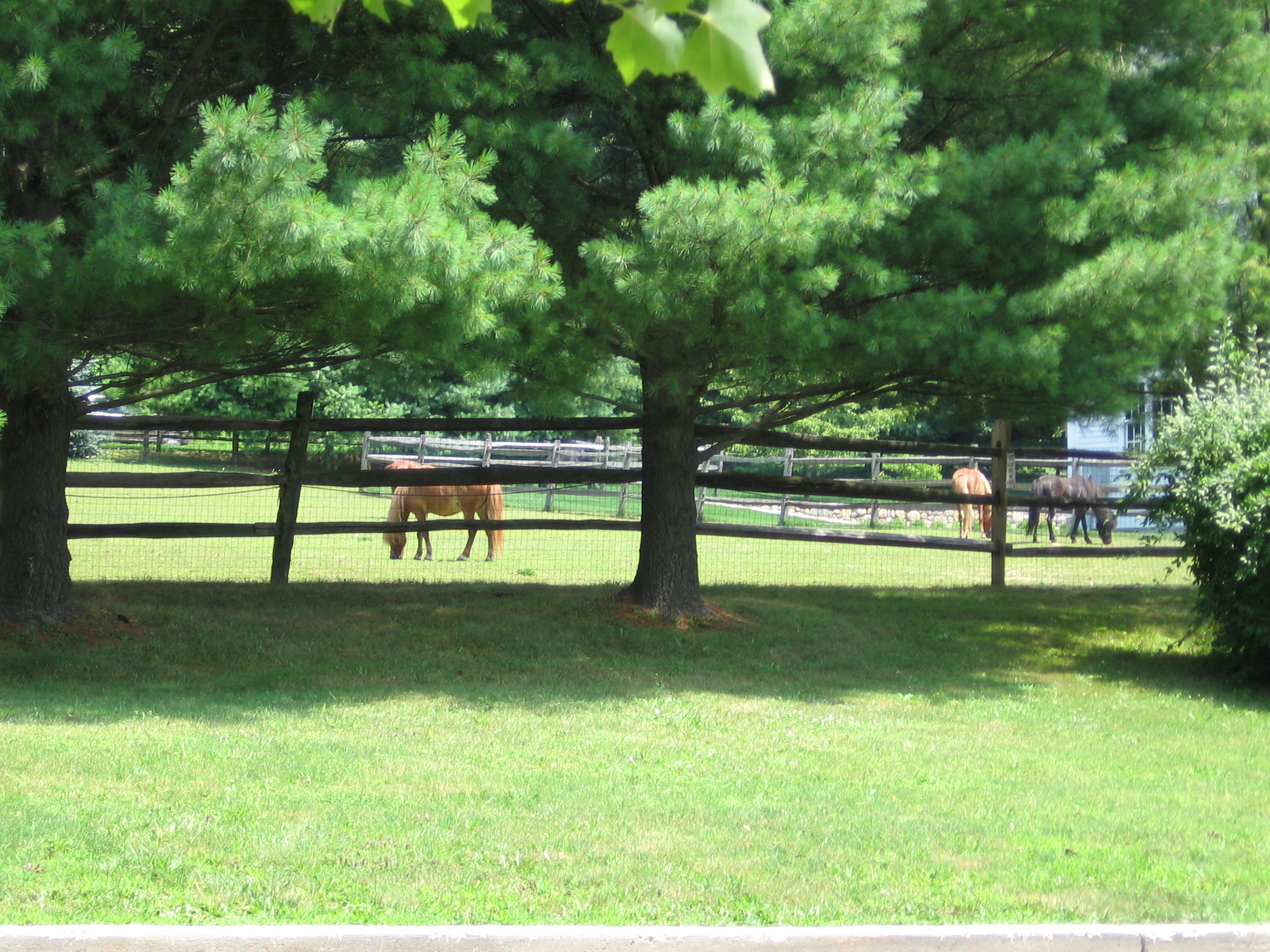
View from Ox Ridge School parking lot

The farthest north of Darien's elementary schools, Ox Ridge School sits behind a small, private equestrian estate. The school's current mascot is Hootie the owl, with the school colors of green and blue. The school's Kids Care Club puts together "Holiday Hope Chests" — decorated shoe boxes with small gifts — for children served by Norwalk's Family and Children's Agency. The students give out the gifts at the agency's annual Christmas party.

- Royle School

Royle School serves about 430 students from kindergarten through fifth grade. The school's colors are blue and white. Its mascot, Sir Learn-a-Lot, is a suit of armor that stands at the main entrance of the school. Professional hockey player Hugh Jessiman (b. 1984), attended the school, as well as Ox Ridge School.

When the Royle School was in a building on the Post Road, movies were shown there until the town movie theater was built in the 1920s.

As of 2003, the school had held an annual "Royle Wrap Up" fundraiser for 17 years. Students sell wrapping paper, candles and gifts in their neighborhoods for the fundraising drive, which accounts for 70 percent of the school Parent Teacher Organization's annual budget. The school enrichment program, funded by the PTO, brings in authors and drama companies to the school and includes an annual class field trip.

The school has held an annual "Back to School Family Picnic" in September. There are competitions among classes, with prizes for boys and girls, making all participants winners. Events include a sack race, "balloon pop race", a water-balloon tossing contest, a tug of war, and the launching of 20 silver balloons (one for each classroom) with postcards attached.

- Tokeneke Elementary School
