= Displays2Go =

American retail display manufacturer

Displays2go
- Company type: Subsidiary of TAKKT
- Industry: E-commerce Retail Display Trade Show
- Founded: 1974; 52 years ago
- Founder: George Patton
- Headquarters: Fall River, Massachusetts, U.S.
- Products: Signage Exhibit Booths Literature Holders Store Merchandising TV & iPad Stands Facilities Banners & Flags Furnishings Presentations Message Boards Display Cases Food Service
- Number of employees: 260
- Parent: TAKKT
- Website: www.displays2go.com

Displays2go is a manufacturer and e-commerce retailer of point-of-sale displays based in Fall River, Massachusetts.

A subsidiary of TAKKT AG, this online business-to-business wholesaler markets its products mainly to retail stores and trade shows. The company adopted its current name in 1996 when it transitioned from a local acrylic display manufacturer to an online merchant, expanding its product line to include store fixtures, trade show supplies, retail media and digital marketing products.

== History ==
=== 1974–2011 ===
Founded in 1974 by George Patton, the company was originally an in-house display manufacturer known as George Patton Associates, Inc. Targeting mainly New England area businesses, GPA expanded rapidly due to Patton's persistent marketing efforts. In 1992, he sold the company to his sons, Tom and Chris.

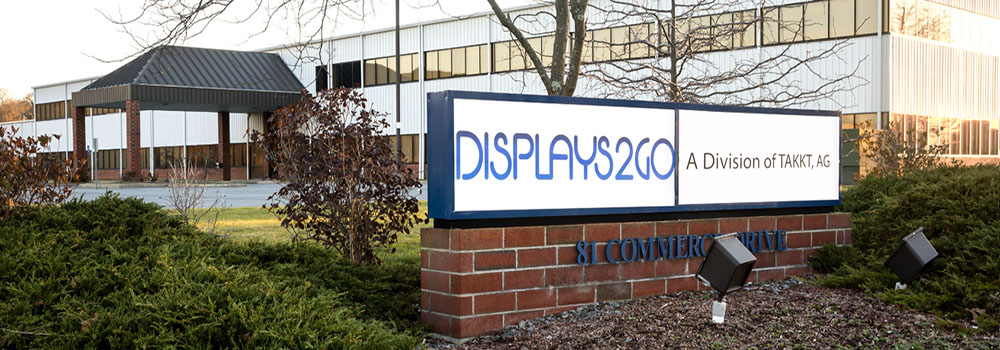
Headquarters in Fall River, MA.

Their catalog business quickly grew, forcing the company to acquire a larger warehouse. In 1997, plans were made to build a new 45,000 sq. ft plant near the company's location on Market St. in Warren, RI, but Warren's water main expansion fell 1600 feet short of where the Pattons planned to build the new warehouse, preventing its construction. Later that year, a purchase and sales agreement was signed on a second location in Warren for an estimated $1.4 million, but it fell through for undisclosed reasons. In 2000, GPA started building a 261,000 sq. ft warehouse and office building in Bristol, RI. The company began focusing on Internet marketing and was renamed to Displays2go.

=== 2012–present ===
Previous logo

In 2012, Displays2go was acquired by the TAKKT Group (ETR: TTK), a subsidiary of the German conglomerate Franz Haniel & Cie., for $120 million. Felix Zimmerman, TAKKT Group's former CEO, later on explained that the acquisition was made to "further diversify [the group's] product portfolio and noticeably extend [its] e-commerce competence."

== See also ==
- Carid.com
- Drizly
