= William Hindley =

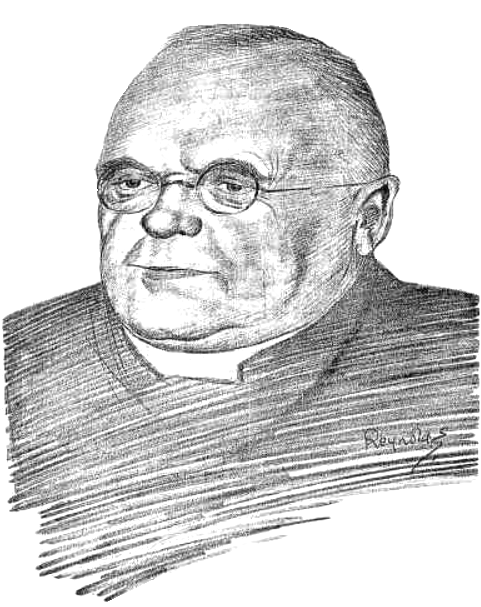
1928 caricature by Reynolds

William George Hindley (born East Retford, Nottinghamshire, England 16 March 1853; died Mount Eliza, Victoria, Australia 18 May 1936) was Archdeacon of Melbourne from 1902 until 1927.

In 1878 he responded to an appeal by James Moorhouse, Bishop of Melbourne for volunteers to work in the bush country of Victoria, Australia. He was ordained deacon in 1880, and priest in 1882. Hindley served at Bairnsdale, Carlton, Kew and East Melbourne.
