= Towerstream =

- Type: Public
- Traded as: Expert Market: TWER
- Industry: Telecommunications
- Founded: 1999
- Founder: Philip Urso; Jeffrey Thompson
- Headquarters: 76 Hammarlund Way Tech III; Middletown, Rhode Island, United States
- Website: towerstream.com

Towerstream Corporation (OTCQB: TWER) is a Fixed Wireless Fiber Alternative company delivering high-speed Internet access to businesses. The company offers broadband services in 12 urban markets including New York City, Boston, Los Angeles, Chicago, Philadelphia, the San Francisco Bay area, Miami, Seattle, Dallas-Fort Worth, Houston, Las Vegas-Reno, and the greater Providence area, where the company is headquartered. In 2014, Towerstream launched its On-Net fixed-wireless service offering On-Net building tenants access to dedicated, symmetrical high-speed Internet connectivity, with a premier SLA, at market-setting prices. Founded in 1999 by Philip Urso (MCF Communications, eFortress) and Jeffrey Thompson (eFortress), Towerstream held its first public offering in January 2007 and traded on the NASDAQ Capital Markets under symbol TWER. In November 2016 the stock had declined in price, was delisted from NASDAQ, and moved to the over-the-counter market.

== Business Broadband Service ==
Towerstream offers service plans from 1.5 Megabit/sec to 1 Gigabit/sec. Bandwidth is available in various increments, is symmetric (bi-directional/duplex) and has a standard installation time of 3–5 days. The service supports voice-over-internet-protocol VoIP, bandwidth-on-demand, virtual private networks VPN, wireless redundancy, and bundled data and video services.

== Wi-Fi network ==
In the middle of 2010, Towerstream started deploying a test Wi-Fi network in Manhattan using 802.11g/n technology with plans to sell wholesale access to carriers for Mobile data offloading in areas of mobile congestion. Towerstream reported that it supported 250,000 connections per day, and moved an average of one terabyte of data per day across the network. In January 2011, Towerstream announced it planned to expand its pilot Wi-Fi network in Manhattan and add San Francisco and Chicago. As of August 2011, Towerstream's Wi-Fi network in Manhattan consisted of over 1000 access points offering 200 Mbit/s each. In August 2011, Towerstream announced its Manhattan Distribution Network which uses its Wi-Fi network as a distribution platform for daily deal sites and mobile app providers. As of September 2013, Towerstream had almost 2,000 outdoor Access Points deployed across Manhattan, and substantial deployments in Miami, Chicago, and San Francisco.

Towerstream is a current member of the Wireless Broadband Alliance and was one of the first to gain Interoperability Compliance Program (ICP) certification from the WBA. In November, 2013 the company announced they will be using their existing network to support the WBA in an upcoming Wi-Fi live roaming experience to demonstrate the Wireless Broadband Alliance's Next Generation Hotspot initiative at the Wi-Fi Global Congress in Beijing, China.

Towerstream is also a current member of the Wi-Fi Alliance.

== Acquisitions ==
On April 16, 2010, Towerstream announced that it had closed the acquisition of Sparkplug Communications' Chicago, Illinois and Nashville, Tennessee business assets. The acquisition allowed the company to expand its presence in Chicago, while introducing Nashville as its 11th market nationally.

On December 16, 2010, Towerstream completed its acquisition of certain business assets from Pipeline Wireless. The acquired business assets include substantially all of Pipeline Wireless' customer contracts, network infrastructure, and related assets in the Boston and Providence markets.

Towerstream closed its third acquisition on May 19, 2011, when it announced it had acquired certain business assets from One Velocity Inc. The acquired business assets include substantially all of the One Velocity's customer contracts, network infrastructure, and related assets in the Las Vegas and Reno, Nevada markets. The company announced at the time of the acquisition the new Las Vegas market immediately became the company's fifth largest revenue base.

On December 5, 2011, Towerstream completed the acquisition of Color Broadband Communications, Inc. This included the acquisition of all of Color Broadband's customer contracts, network infrastructure and related assets in the Los Angeles market.

Towerstream completed the acquisition of Delos Internet which operated in Houston, TX on March 5, 2013. This marked the company's fifth acquisition and expanding the company's presence to 13 markets.

== History ==
The company was founded in 1999 by Philip Urso and Jeffrey Thompson as a replacement to the legacy copper line T1, DS3, and OC-3 infrastructure. Initially serving two markets, Providence Rhode Island and Boston, Massachusetts, Towerstream's service area was expanded in 2003 to include New York City, and then expanded a year later to include Chicago and Los Angeles. Towerstream expanded into San Francisco in 2005. FierceVoIP's annual Fierce 15 list named Towerstream as one of the top 15 emerging companies implementing a T1 VoIP solution for 2005. In January 2007 Towerstream completed a reverse merger, raised $15 million in capital and commenced trading common stock on the OTC Bulletin Board under the symbol TWER. By May 2007, Towerstream stock was moved to NASDAQ Capital Markets and the company raised an additional $40 million in capital. Service coverage area was extended to include Seattle, Miami, and Dallas. In late 2008, Towerstream was honored by Xchange magazine with the Best of WiMAX World Award for its New York City network T1 and DS3 offerings and also honored by Telephony Online with two Telephony Innovation Awards "Most Innovative Broadband Wireless Service" and "Most Innovative Small Business Service".

In November 2009, Towerstream expanded service in Philadelphia and in April 2010 purchased Sparkplug's business assets in Chicago and Nashville, increasing Chicago's customer base to be Towerstream's third largest coverage area. In December 2010, the company expanded its presence in the Boston and Providence markets when it acquired business assets of Sparkplug Communications. In 2011, Towerstream entered the Las Vegas/Reno market with its acquisition of all of the One Velocity's customer contracts, network infrastructure, and related assets in those cities.

On July 13, 2011, Towerstream representatives visited the NASDAQ MarketSite in New York City's Times Square, where the CEO rang the closing bell.

In January 2013, HetNets Tower Corporation was formed as a wholly owned susididary of Towerstream Corporation. HetNets closed its operations on March 15, 2016.

In November 2015, Nasdaq and the SEC warned TWER of a risk of delisting for its closing price staying under $1.00 for 30 days.

In November 2016, TWER delisted from Nasdaq and moved to the OTCQB over-the-counter market.

== Technology ==
Towerstream markets a combination of Fixed Wireless and WiMAX (802.16e) technology as "4G". Fixed wireless networks use Ethernet technology, not TDM that the legacy infrastructure relies on and have been in production since the 1970s, primarily used for backhaul in voice networks for phone companies. The network uses Radio Frequency (RF) base stations to provide Internet access. Towerstream base stations connect to multiple Tier 1 network IP backbone service providers, to ensure continuous service should any of the fiber providers go down.

Towerstream's markets operating with WiMAX technology use the 3.65 GHz spectrum band and are true Non-Line-of-Site (NLOS). Its markets using Fixed WiMAX service run over the 5.8 GHz spectrum band and are Line-of-Site (LOS).

In 2014, Towerstream launched its On-Net fixed wireless service, which provides building owners and property managers with a network that connects to Towerstream's fiber backbone. On-Net building tenants have access to 100 Mbit/s of dedicated, symmetrical Internet connectivity with a service-level agreement (SLA). These buildings use Towerstream's fixed wireless network, which is installed on buildings in urban areas and connects to the company's fiber backbone. Towerstream installs the necessary equipment in each building to provide businesses at that location with 100 Mbit/s connections.

== HetNets Tower Corporation ==
HetNets Tower Corporation ("HetNets") was formed in January 2013 as a wholly owned subsidiary of Towerstream Corporation (Nasdaq:TWER), offering a neutral host, shared wireless infrastructure solution, either independently or as a turnkey service. Its wireless communications infrastructure was available to wireless carriers, cable and Internet companies in major urban markets where the explosion in mobile data is creating significant demand for additional capacity and coverage. HetNets offered a carrier-class Wi-Fi network for Internet access and the offloading of mobile data. On March 15, 2016, Towerstream announced that the company had closed HetNets Tower Corporation.

== See also ==
- WiMAX
- Wireless Broadband
- Fixed wireless
- Internet service provider
- List of Metro Wireless Providers in the United States
