= Manpacks =

- Type: Private
- Industry: Men's essentials subscription
- Founded: January 2010
- Defunct: August 2018
- Headquarters: Providence, Rhode Island,
- Key people: Founded by Ken Johnson and Andrew Draper
- Products: Men's underwear, undershirts, socks, hygienic items
- Website: http://www.manpacks.com/

Manpacks was a quarterly subscription service offering men's underwear, socks, toiletries and other basic needs. Buyers created their pack with offered items including boxer briefs, undershirts, socks, shaving products, and condoms, and the pack was automatically delivered every three months. The service has been discontinued.

== Foundation ==
Ken Johnson and Andrew Draper started working on the concept for Manpacks in December 2009 and founded the company in January 2010. Manpacks began as an experimental side project, but demand increased. Soon, customer management and the processing of orders turned into a full-time job. Upon launch, the site only offered underwear and socks.

Manpacks was the first American subscription ecommerce service offering men's essentials. Numerous sites have since spawned and imitated Manpacks' business model. Shortly after launch, Manpacks was accepted into Betaspring's startup accelerator program. The company at one time had more than 10,000 subscribers.

== Description ==
Manpacks automatically shipped men basic needs like socks, underwear, razors, and toiletries every three months or when desired. Three months after placing an order, Manpacks would send customers a shipment reminder email. Manpacks' primary customers were people buying for the men in their life, men who are averse to shopping, and the lazy.
