= Hindley School =

Elementary in Darien, Connecticut

Coordinates: 41.0581°N 73.4886°W

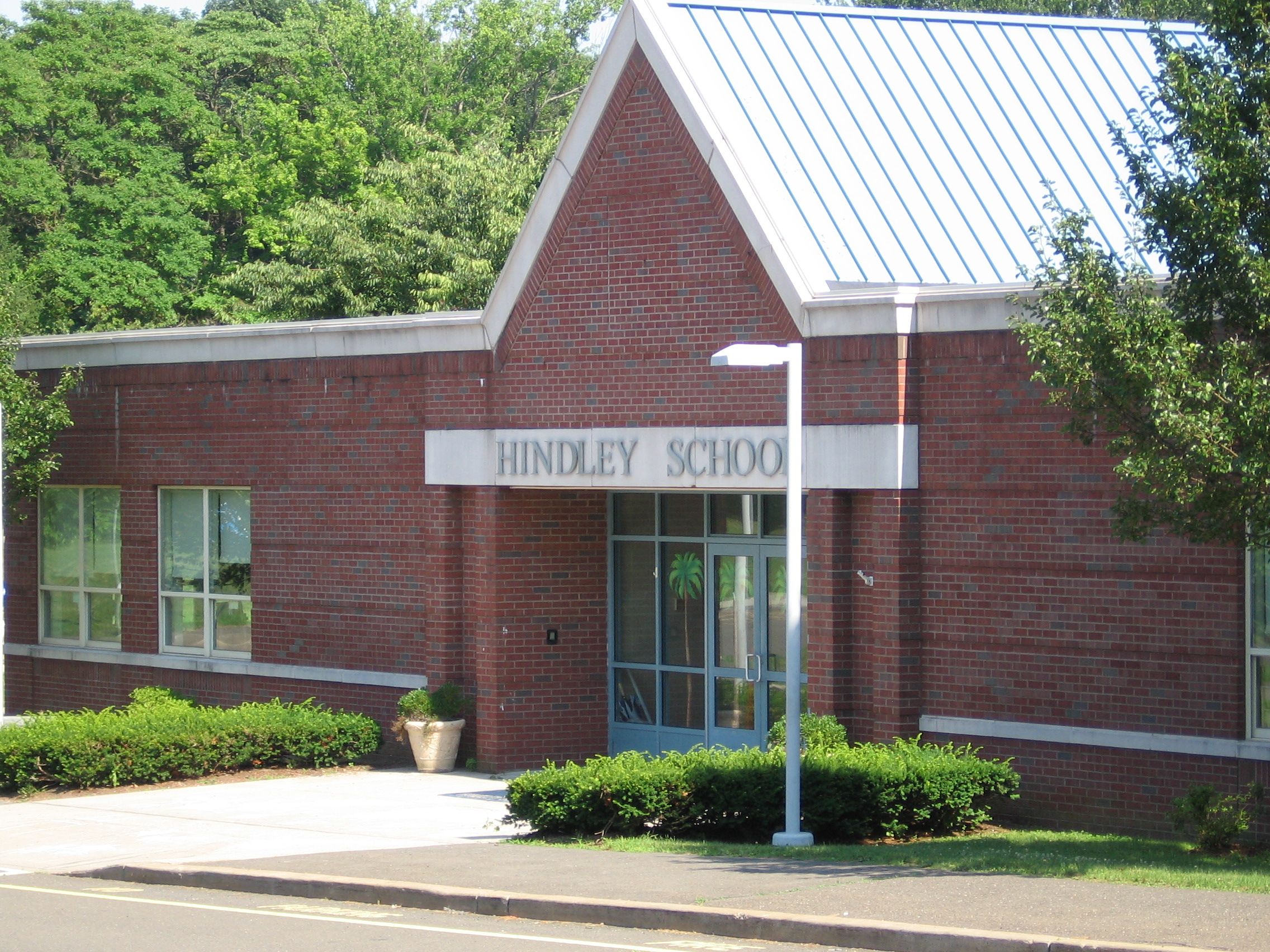
Entrance (north side)

Hindley School is one of the 5 elementary schools in Darien, Connecticut, serving roughly 550 pupils from kindergarten through Grade 5. A part of Darien Public Schools, Hindley sits at 10 Nearwater Lane (at the intersection of Nearwater Lane and the Boston Post Road) in the Noroton section of Darien. Every year, Hindley hosts a town fair called the Hindley Happening.

== Overview ==
Hindley's school day lasts from 8:25 a.m. to 2:55 p.m. The Hindley Husky is the official mascot and appears on the mural at the schools cafeteria. Parents of Hindley students have set up a weekly emailed newsletter dubbed "The WIRE", which describes upcoming events. The principal of Hindley School is Ross Cooper.

Hindley has a school orchestra, band and chorus which together give a holiday concert each December. For decades also the band chorus and orchestra perform in a spring concert. The Hindley Happening, a small fair, which has been held each spring on the school grounds.

The school has a Kids Care Club. In December 2007, the club helped in a school-wide community service project to donate more than 100 "Holiday Hope Chests" to foster children served by the state Department of Children and Families in Bridgeport. The "chests" are shoe boxes filled with hats, gloves, small toiletries, crafts, books and the like for teenagers and pre-teens.

== History ==
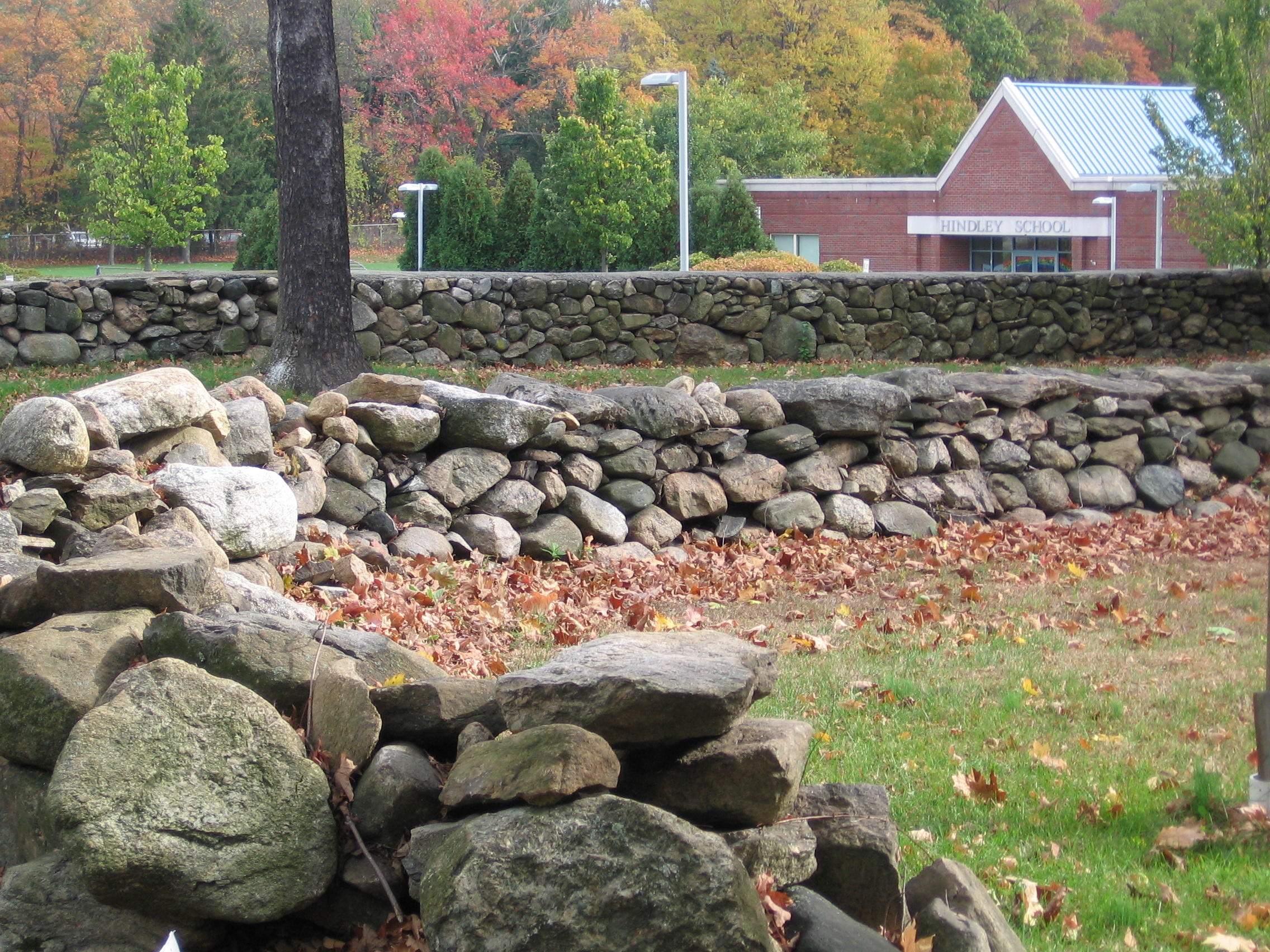
Stone walls on and near the school grounds where patriots were killed in the American Revolution

Hindley stands on historic ground. Nearby, at the corner of Noroton Avenue and the Boston Post Road, a skirmish during the American Revolution between local patriots and raiding Tories based on Long Island resulted in the deaths of several patriots, who were ambushed at the stone walls which still exist at the corner. Just to the east, across the street from the Noroton Presbyterian Church, about where the school basketball courts are located, a "Union Church" was set up in the early 19th century. The church provided services for people of various denominations other than the official Congregational Church and was set up to promote religious freedom. Neighborhood schools have existed in the Noroton neighborhood since 1703, when a school was built on the same corner but across Nearwater Lane from Hindley.

Hindley School was built in the late 1940s to replace a 1908 building on the same tract of land. An unexpected surge in the town's school population persuaded the Board of Education to keep the old building, then called "Hindley Annex", which remained for years before it was eventually torn down.

Hindley School was named after the late Edward Benham Hindley (1867–1952), a Darien resident who served on the Board of Education as a Selectman.

In 2005, members of the sixth-grade Hindley "Class of 1965" organized a 40th reunion attended by 25 former students. Many of them remembered all the verses to a Hindley school song, ""This Little Hindley Light of Mine", taught to them by Frank Tonis, the principal at the time.

The Hindley School Association donated $30,000 to the school in 2006 to construct a new playground, replacing equipment that some parents considered possibly unsafe.

In 2012, Hindley School was recognized as a National Blue Ribbon School

== Pictures ==
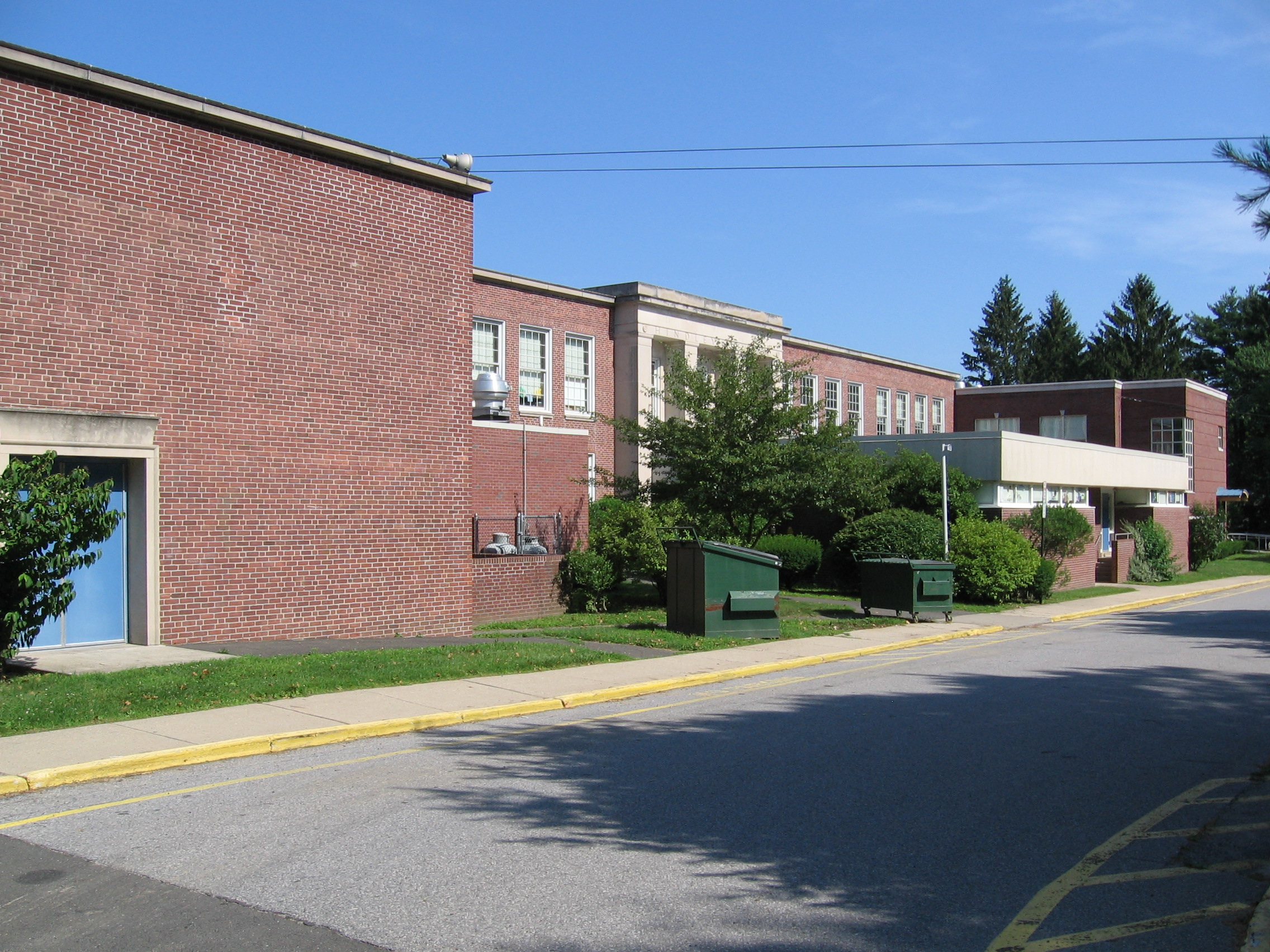
Former front of building, facing Nearwater Lane

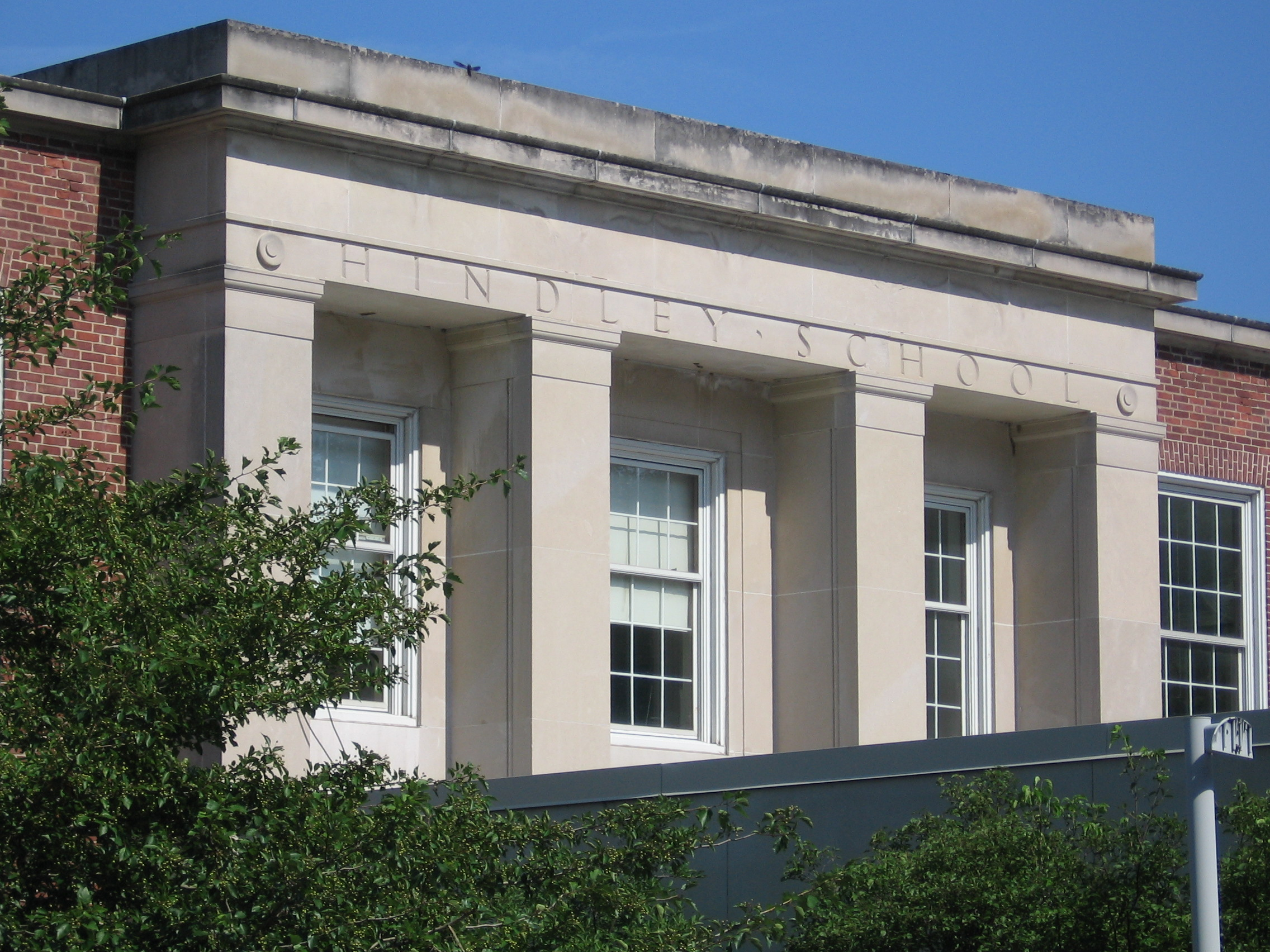
Hindley name at former front of building which is now the Bus Loop.
