= Peter Hindley =

English footballer (1944–2021)

Personal information
- Date of birth: 19 May 1944
- Place of birth: Worksop, England
- Date of death: 1 February 2021 (aged 76)
- Height: 5 ft 11 in (1.80 m)
- Position: Right-back

Senior career*
Years	Team	Apps	(Gls)
1962–1973	Nottingham Forest	366	(10)
1973–1976	Coventry City	33	(0)
1976–1979	Peterborough United	112	(1)
1979–1981	Burton Albion	97	(1)
Total		511	(11)

International career
1967	England U23	1	(0)
- * Club domestic league appearances and goals

Peter Hindley (19 May 1944 – 1 February 2021), nicknamed 'Tank', was an English footballer who played in the Football League for Nottingham Forest, Coventry City and Peterborough United. He represented England at under-23 level.

Ian Storey-Moore, a fellow Forest team member, is quoted as saying "Peter Hindley was tough as old boots for us. No one messed with him'.

His father, Frank Hindley, played League football for Nottingham Forest and Brighton & Hove Albion either side of the Second World War.

Peter Hindley finished his playing career at non-league Burton Albion who were then managed by former Forest team mate Ian Storey-Moore. He had two full seasons with Burton, playing in 97 games and scoring once.

After he finished playing football, Hindley remained in the Peterborough area and became a Painter and Decorator. He also owned Greyhounds.

He died from dementia, on 1 February 2021, at the age of 76.
