= Cavanagh Company =

American bakery

- Company type: Private
- Industry: Bakery
- Founded: 1943; 82 years ago in Greenville, Rhode Island, United States
- Founders: John F. Cavanagh Sr. and Jr.
- Headquarters: Greenville, Rhode Island, United States
- Products: Altar bread
- Website: cavanaghco.com

The Cavanagh Company is an American bakery that is specialized in manufacturing and supplying altar bread, mainly to Catholic, Episcopal, Lutheran and Southern Baptist churches in the United States, Australia, Canada and United Kingdom. They are based in Greenville, Rhode Island, and sell approximately 850 million wafers each year.
