= Nail Communications =

American advertising agency

- Type: Private
- Industry: Business Services
- Founded: October 25, 1998
- Headquarters: Providence, RI, USA
- Key people: Founders: Chuck Carmone and Brian Gross
- Products: Advertising & Marketing
- Website: www.nail.cc

Nail Communications (commonly referred to as Nail) is an independently owned American advertising agency headquartered in Providence, Rhode Island. Nail was named 2013 Northeast Small Agency of the Year by AdAge.

== Notable Campaigns ==
In 2010, Nail created an innovative interactive film for Vibram, YouAreTheTechnology.com that won several international awards.

That same year, the agency made a nationally-recognized campaign introducing a brand called "Nothing". Empty cans of "Nothing" were sold in grocery stores throughout the state of Rhode Island. Proceeds from their sale went to Rhode Island Community Food Bank.

In 2012, Nail guided a rebranding effort for The Providence Journal around the tagline "We Work for the Truth."

Nail crafted the high-profile "break up" of candy characters Mike and Ike in 2012 due to "creative differences". In 2013, Nail produced a trailer for a movie about the "reunion" of Mike and Ike.

== Awards ==
Over its history, Nail has won scores of Hatch Awards for Creative Excellence given by The Ad Club including 16 in 2012.

In 2010, the agency received a Jay Chiat Strategic Planning Award Gold.

In 2011, the company was Webby Award Finalist and Honoree, won a One Show Gold Pencil and Finalist and an Effie Gold.

In 2012, Nail was a part of the Facebook Studio Gallery Selection.

In 2013, the company was shortlisted at the Clio Awards.

In 2013, the agency was rated one of the "best places to work" in Rhode Island.

In 2013, Nail was named "Small Agency of the Year: Northeast Region" by Ad Age.

In 2014, Nail won first place in the Boston Ad Club's Brand-a-thon
