= Actin related protein 2/3 complex inhibitor =

Protein-coding gene in the species Homo sapiens

ARPIN

Identifiers
- Aliases: ARPIN, C15orf38, actin-related protein 2/3 complex inhibitor, actin related protein 2/3 complex inhibitor
- External IDs: OMIM: 615543; MGI: 1917670; GeneCards: ARPIN
Available structures
PDB	Ortholog search: PDBe RCSB
PDB	List of PDB id codes 4Z68

Gene location (Human)
Chr.	Chromosome 15 (human)
Band	15q26.1	Start	89,895,006 bp
Band	15q26.1	End	89,912,952 bp

Gene location (Mouse)
Chr.	Chromosome 7 (mouse)
Band	7|7 D2	Start	79,575,109 bp
Band	7|7 D2	End	79,585,107 bp
RNA expression pattern
Bgee	Human / Mouse (ortholog); Top expressed in: body of pancreas; corpus epididymis; mucosa of sigmoid colon; epithelium of colon; synovial joint; seminal vesicula; urethra; right ventricle; caput epididymis; nipple / Top expressed in: external carotid artery; internal carotid artery; endothelial cell of lymphatic vessel; otolith organ; duodenum; utricle; jejunum; ileum; migratory enteric neural crest cell; yolk sac; More reference expression data
BioGPS	n/a
Gene ontology
Molecular function	protein binding
Cellular component	cell projection; lamellipodium
Biological process	negative regulation of lamellipodium morphogenesis; directional locomotion; negative regulation of cell migration; negative regulation of actin nucleation
Sources:Amigo / QuickGO
Orthologs
Databases	NCBI: entry; OMA: entry
Species	Human	Mouse
Entrez	348110	70420
Ensembl	ENSG00000242498	ENSMUSG00000039043
UniProt	Q7Z6K5	Q9D0A3
RefSeq (mRNA)	NM_182616; NM_001282380	NM_027420
RefSeq (protein)	NP_001269309; NP_872422	NP_081696
Location (UCSC)	Chr 15: 89.9 – 89.91 Mb	Chr 7: 79.58 – 79.59 Mb
PubMed search
- Wikidata
View/Edit Human	View/Edit Mouse

Actin related protein 2/3 complex inhibitor is a protein that in humans is encoded by the ARPIN gene.
