= Brian Hindley =

English rugby league footballer

Personal information
- Full name: Brian Hindley
- Born: 1944 (age 81–82) Salford, England

Playing information
- Position: Centre
Club
Years	Team	Pld	T	G	FG	P
1962–63	Warrington	4	0	0	0	0
- As of 26 July 2021

Brian Hindley (born 1944) was a professional rugby league footballer who played for Warrington RLFC between 1962 and 1963. He made his professional debut in February 1962, aged 17.

Hindley played as a Centre and was part of the Warrington team that won the 1962 Lancashire Cup against Rochdale Hornets.
