= Ceco Manufacturing Company =

Ceco Manufacturing Company was a Providence, Rhode Island, US, firm which acquired a license to manufacture radio tubes in May 1929. Radio Corporation of America issued the license under Radio Corp. patents. The business was the second corporation licensed to produce radio tubes.

In April 1930, there were fourteen businesses authorized to manufacture radio tubes in the United States. For some time, they had a factory in Birmingham, Alabama, but it was closed due to labor discord. The company was acquired for $8.5 million by Richardson Electronics Ltd., of Franklin Park, Illinois, in September 1985.
