= Arpin (town), Wisconsin =

Arpin
- Town
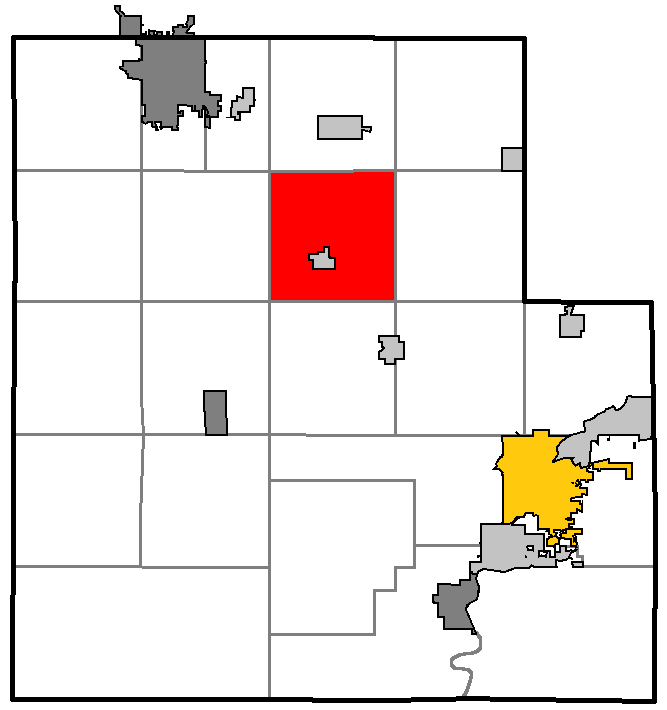
- Location within Wood County, Wisconsin

- Location within the state of Wisconsin
- Coordinates: 44°32′27″N 90°2′2″W
- Country: United States
- State: Wisconsin
- County: Wood

Area
  - Total: 33.0 sq mi (85.5 km^{2})
  - Land: 33.0 sq mi (85.5 km^{2})

Population (2020)
  - Total: 942
  - Density: 28.5/sq mi (11.0/km^{2})
- Time zone: UTC-6 (Central (CST))
  - Summer (DST): UTC-5 (CDT)
- Area codes: 715 & 534
- PLSS township: T24N R4E
- Website: https://townarpin.gov/

Arpin is a town in Wood County, Wisconsin, United States. The population was 942 at the 2020 census.

== History ==
In 1851 the outline of the six-mile (9.7 km) square which later became the town of Arpin was surveyed by crews working for the U.S. government. They found the section corners with chain and compass and marked them. When done, the deputy surveyors filed these general descriptions:

The soil in this Township is generally a dark loam and is very (?), the surface is generally level, except in the South western part which is Rolling and somewhat stony - the stone are a Blue Flint - The Timber in the South West Part is mostly Sugar (?) Ironwood & Butternut with very little or no undergrowth. The Eastern and Northern Part is heavily timbered also the Timber being mostly Birch Oak Pine Soft Maple with some undergrowth of Blue Beech along the Border of the streams. We usually find alder thickets caused by the overflowing of the Bottom Lands in times of high water & from Beaver Dams. The streams are mostly fed by the swamps and are subject to (?) sudden rise and fall.

This may be considered a valuable district of which a considerable portion would command a ready rate, if in market at the present time. There is no settlement upon it. A few small rough log cabins, occupied in the winter season by the shingle makers, comprise all the improvements on it.

== Geography ==
According to the United States Census Bureau, the town has a total area of 33.0 square miles (85.5 km^{2}), all land.

== Demographics ==
As of the census of 2000, there were 786 people, 267 households, and 213 families residing in the town. The population density was 23.8 inhabitants per square mile (9.2/km^{2}). There were 280 housing units at an average density of 8.5 per square mile (3.3/km^{2}). The racial makeup of the town was 97.84% White, 0.13% Black or African American, 0.13% Native American, 0.25% Asian, 0.25% from other races, and 1.40% from two or more races. 1.15% of the population were Hispanic or Latino of any race.

There were 267 households, out of which 42.7% had children under the age of 18 living with them, 70.8% were married couples living together, 3.7% had a female householder with no husband present, and 20.2% were non-families. 15.0% of all households were made up of individuals, and 7.5% had someone living alone who was 65 years of age or older. The average household size was 2.94 and the average family size was 3.31.

In the town, the population was spread out, with 30.7% under the age of 18, 7.4% from 18 to 24, 30.7% from 25 to 44, 23.8% from 45 to 64, and 7.5% who were 65 years of age or older. The median age was 35 years. For every 100 females, there were 106.8 males. For every 100 females age 18 and over, there were 114.6 males.

The median income for a household in the town was $42,115, and the median income for a family was $45,313. Males had a median income of $27,679 versus $23,864 for females. The per capita income for the town was $15,750. About 7.7% of families and 8.1% of the population were below the poverty line, including 11.3% of those under age 18 and none of those age 65 or over.
