= Charles Hindley =

Charles Hindley may refer to:

- Charles Hindley (politician) (1796–1857), member of parliament for Ashton-under-Lyne, Lancashire, England
- Charles Hindley (jockey), winner of the Epsom Derby and Epsom Oaks in the 18th century
