= Frank Hindley =

English footballer

Personal information
- Full name: Frank Charles Hindley
- Date of birth: 2 November 1915
- Place of birth: Worksop, England
- Date of death: 26 March 2003 (aged 87)
- Place of death: Worksop, England
- Height: 5 ft 10 in (1.78 m)
- Position: Centre forward

Senior career*
Years	Team	Apps	(Gls)
19??–1937	Netherton United		
1937–1939	Nottingham Forest	6	(3)
1939–1947	Brighton & Hove Albion	10	(4)
1946	Peterborough United	6	(1)
- * Club domestic league appearances and goals

Frank Charles Hindley (2 November 1915 – 26 March 2003) was an English professional footballer who played as a centre forward in the Football League for Nottingham Forest and Brighton & Hove Albion either side of the Second World War. He made his Brighton debut in the first of two appearances in the 1939–40 Football League season abandoned, along with its statistics and records, on the outbreak of war. He made a few appearances for Peterborough United in the first post-war season of the Midland League, then returned to Brighton for a season before retiring from the game.

Hindley was born in Worksop, Nottinghamshire, in 1915 and died there in 2003. His son Peter played more than 500 Football League matches for Nottingham Forest, Coventry City and Peterborough United in the 1960s and 1970s.
