= CARiD.com =

American online retailer

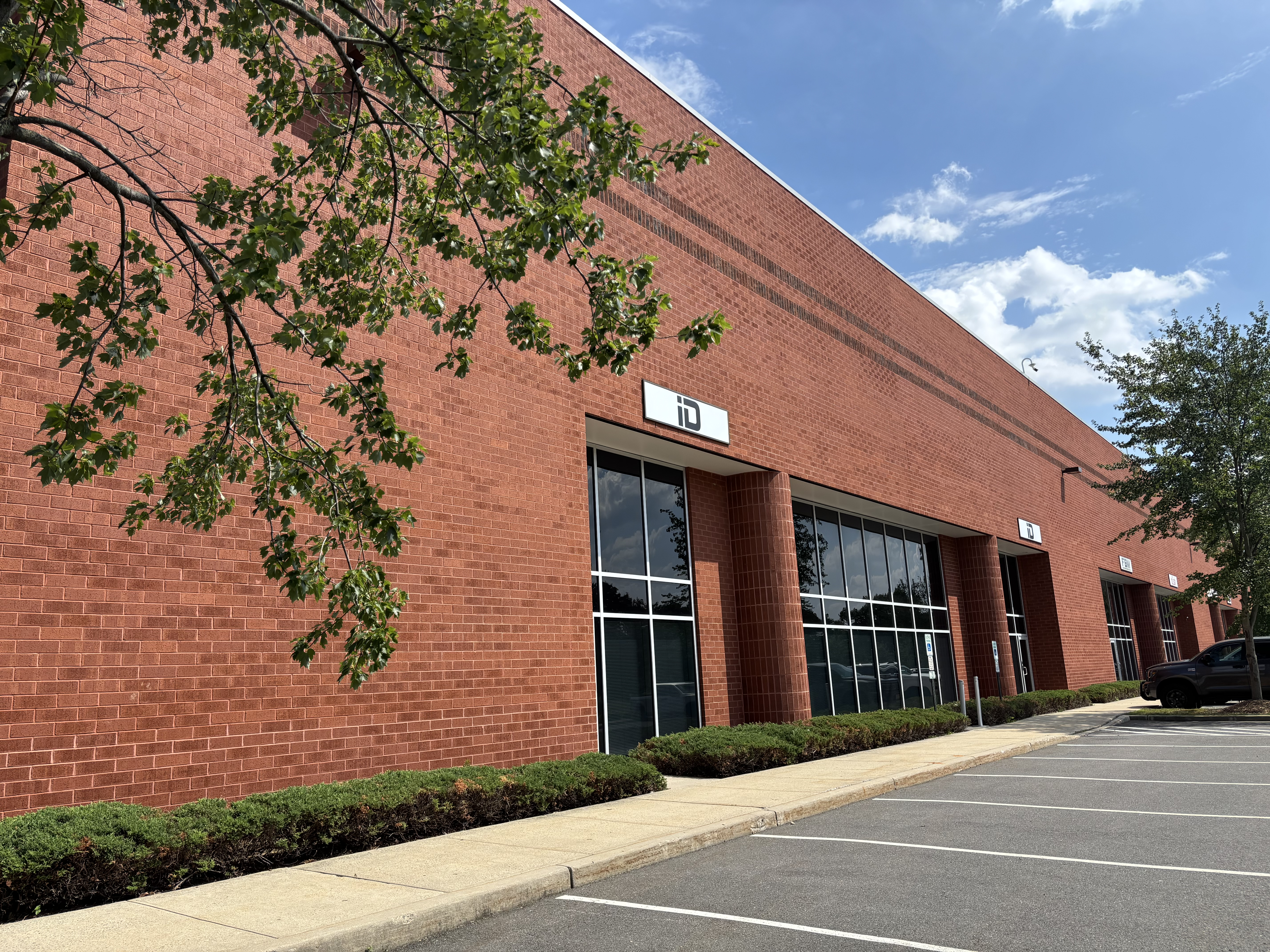
- CARiD Headquarters
- Company type: Subsidiary
- Industry: Auto parts eCommerce retail
- Founded: 2008; 18 years ago
- Founders: Roman Gerashenko and Steven Royzenshteyn
- Headquarters: Cranbury, New Jersey, U.S.
- Area served: United States; Canada; North America
- Key people: Lev Peker (CEO); Sanjiv Gomes (СIO)
- Products: Automotive parts and automotive accessories
- Parent: ID Auto Inc.
- Website: carid.com

CARiD.com (previously Onyx Enterprises Inc.) is an American online retailer specializing in aftermarket automotive parts and accessories. The company is headquartered in Cranbury, New Jersey. CARiD operates as one of the eight brands under the umbrella of ID Auto Inc., serving customers across the United States through its e-commerce platform.

== History ==
The company was founded as Onyx Enterprises Inc. in 2008, and initially focused on selling automotive accessories.

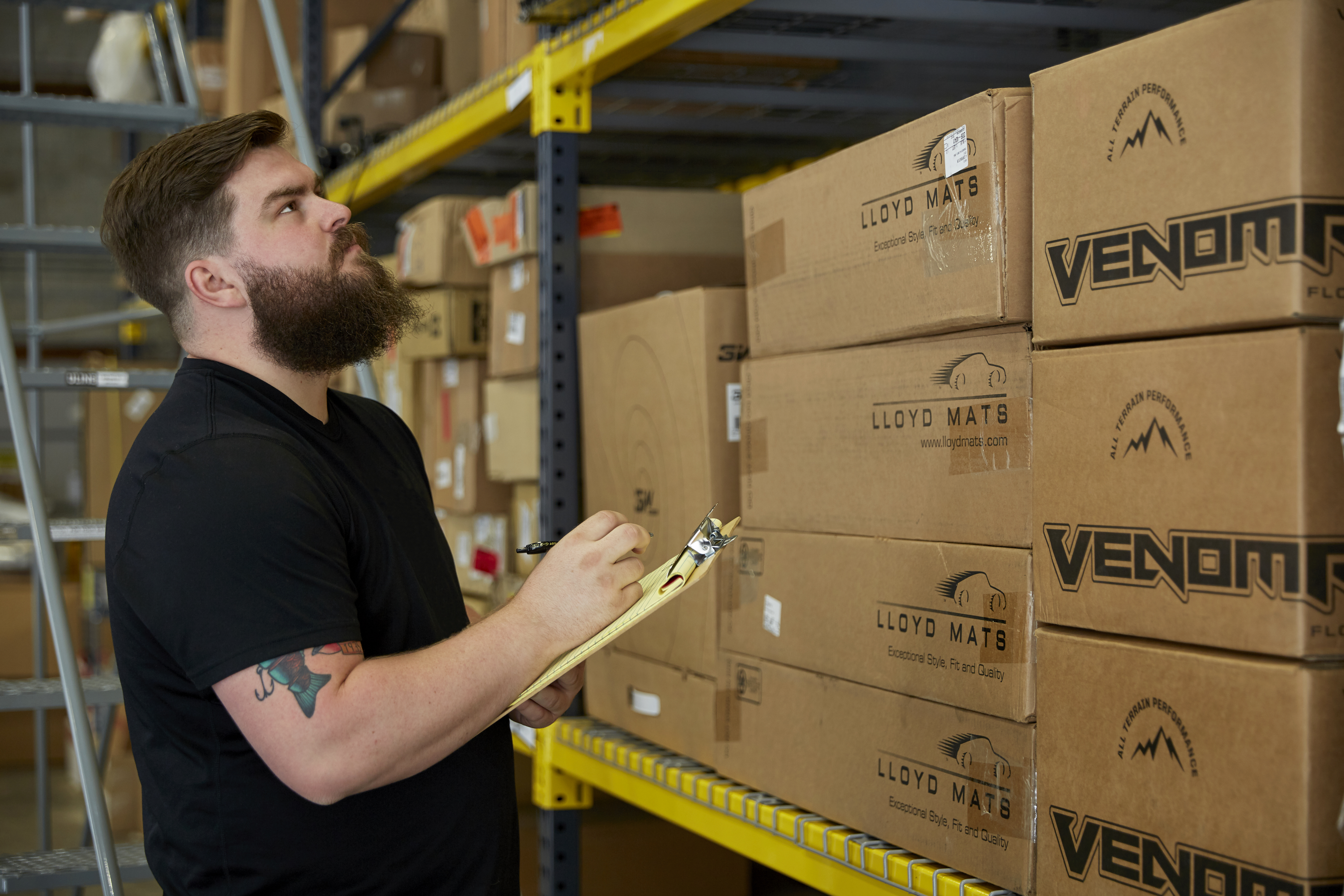
CARiD warehouse facility

In 2015, the company was approved to enter the Google Trusted Stores program.

In 2018 Onyx announced the launch of 7 additional websites focused on related consumer niche industries.

In 2020, Onyx Enterprises entered into an agreement with Legacy Acquisition Corp. that resulted in Onyx becoming a wholly owned subsidiary of Legacy. Following the merger, the combined company was renamed Parts iD, Inc. and became publicly listed on the New York Stock Exchange, trading under the symbol "ID."

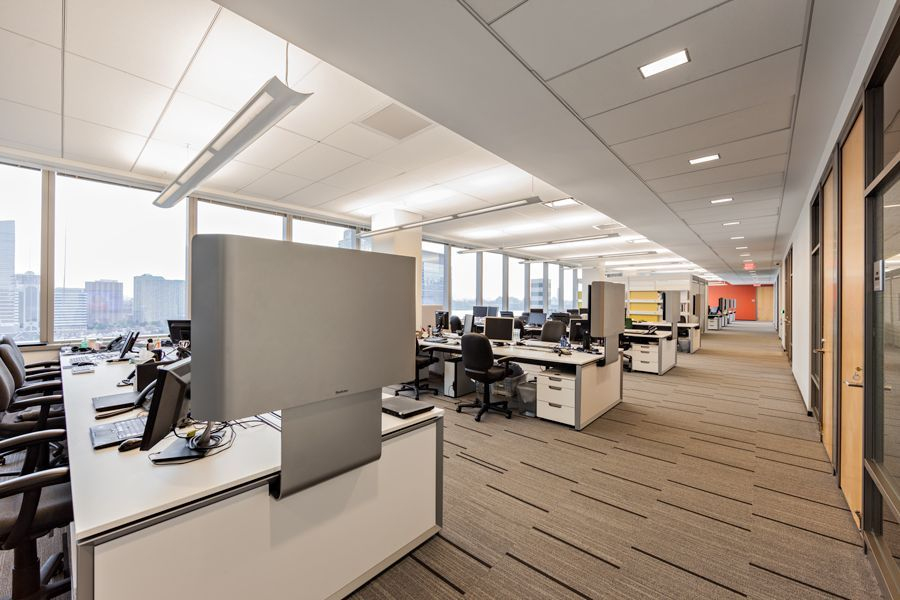
CARiD office workspace

By 2021, the company established partnerships with about 2,100 tire installation locations across the U.S. The tire installation network expanded to 7,270 locations in the first quarter of 2022, covering all 48 contiguous U.S. states and Washington, D.C.

Until December 2023, Parts iD was operating the CARiD.com website. Following this, the business entered a credit agreement with Fifth Star Inc., which late, in 2024, resulted in Fifth Star acquiring a majority stake in CARiD with its $35 million investment. ID Auto Inc. became a new operating company.

== Operations ==
CARiD operates under parent company ID Auto, Inc. (formerly PARTS iD, Inc.) and offers approximately 17 million SKUs across nearly 5,500 brands, ranging from name-brand aftermarket and OEM to private-label products. The company works a light-asset business model that involves partnerships with vendors and distributor networks rather than direct warehousing. In 2018, the business launched seven new niche websites dedicated to specialized vehicle categories, including motorcycles, boats, trucks, and powersports. CARiD uses AI-based fitment technology to improve vehicle parts compatibility.

== See also ==
- AutoZone
- National Automotive Parts Association (NAPA)
- O'Reilly Auto Parts
