= Lapine =

Lapine may refer to:

== People ==
- Anatole Lapine (1930–2012), Latvian-born automotive designer and racing driver
- André Lapine (1866–1952), Latvian-born Canadian painter
- James Lapine (born 1949), American stage director, playwright, screenwriter and librettist
- Warren Lapine (born 1964), publisher of science fiction magazines

== Other uses ==
- Lapine, Alabama, United States, an unincorporated community
- Lapine language, a fictional language spoken by the rabbits of Richard Adams' novel Watership Down

== See also ==
- La Pine, Oregon, a city
  - La Pine Senior High School
