= Roland Arpin =

Quebecois educator, communicator, and public administrator

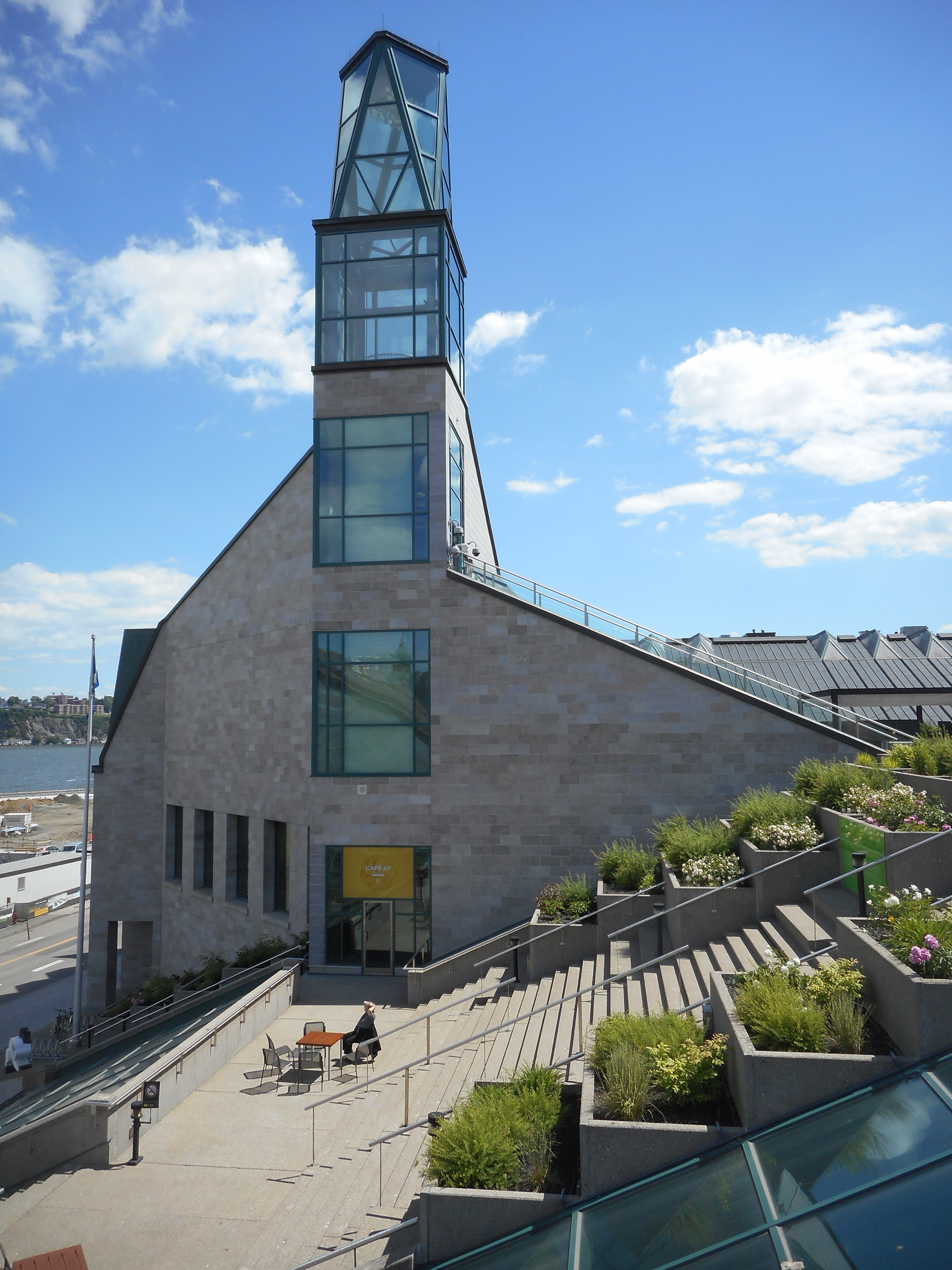
- Le Musée de la civilisation, which Mr. Arpen founded and felt defines him best.
- Born: 27 April 1934; Montréal, Rosemont, Canada
- Died: 2 September 2010 (aged 76); Quebec, Canada
- Known for: Deputy Minister for Education, Deputy Minister for Culture, Director General of the Musée de la Civilisation.

Roland Arpin (27 April 1934 – 2 September 2010) was an educator, communicator, and public administrator in the Canadian province of Quebec. There, he served as Deputy Minister for Education, Deputy Minister for Culture, and as Director of Working Groups which report to the government of Quebec. He is most known for his work as founder and first Director General of the Musée de la civilisation in the city of Quebec.

== Biography and early career ==
Arpin was born in 1934 in Montreal to Jean, a furrier, and Florence (née Courte). He attended a high school run by a catholic order of teaching lay brothers. He decided to join them upon graduation and after a year of novitiate training, he began attending a normal school in Laval-des-Rapides. He obtained a certificate of higher education and began teaching in 1955 while simultaneously completing a Bachelor's degree in education, earned in 1960, and then a second degree in literature, earned in 1967, both from the University of Montreal. That same year, after having taught for 12 years at primary to university level, he decided to leave the lay brothers and become a school administrator at the Collège de Maisonneuve in Montreal just at the point in time that it transitioned from being a private, family-run institution to a publicly-funded college. He progressed there from Director of Personnel to the General Director during a five-year span. From 1972 to 1975, he served as president of the Federation of General and Professional Colleges (cegeps) and the Centre for Research and Animation in Education. In 1975, Arpin became Deputy Minister for Planning and Budget at the Quebec Ministry of Education. Many government missions led him abroad as when, from 1976 to 1980, he joined the Education Commission of the OECD in Paris, serving as vice-president for two years.

== The Museum of Civilization (Musée de la civilisation) ==
Returning to Quebec, Arpin was appointed Deputy Minister of Cultural Affairs in 1980, during which time he oversaw the designing and planning of the future Museum of Civilization in Quebec. In 1984 he moved closer to the heart of Quebec's provincial government administration when he was appointed Secretary of the Treasury Board in 1984.

By 1987 the Museum of Civilization was foundering; its director had resigned and it was suffering from lack of interest in completion. As Treasury Secretary, Arpin was close enough to Quebec premier Robert Bourassa to accept Bourassas's suggestion that he return to the ailing project. Under Arpin's leadership it opened its doors the following year. He led the institution as its director until 2001. He saw a museum as having a place in the political life of a community and also placed great value on an evolving relationship between the museum and the public, placing the visitor at the center of its approach. He is known for innovating a collaborative style of museum management that favored producing exhibits under teams of professionals from widely disparate disciplines rather than relying curators on alone. He advocated for researchers, designers, educators, IT specialists, audiovisual specialists, lighting designers and graphic designers to join curators to produce exhibits. The museum, a combination of anthropology museum and history museum, still operates according to his vision.

In 1991 the Director of Musées de France asked him to develop a plan to revive the ailing National Museum of Folk Arts and Traditions in Paris. Though Arpin's ideas have proved popular with the public, his groundbreaking recommendations of reliance on researchers over curators were not followed. The museum ultimately failed, was moved to Marseille and entirely restructured.

Earlier that year, in February, Quebec's Minister of Cultural Affairs had assigned Arpin to chair the Groupe-conseil sur la politique culturelle du Québec, which developed a draft cultural policy for Quebec. Bourassa incorporated this into his cultural policy in 1992. However, aboriginal people complained that they had not heard about the plan in time to provide input. Other criticisms of Arpin's vision have surfaced, specifically from Isak Chiva, who felt that museums were focusing on theatre rather than leading in research. Nonetheless, Arpin's Museum of Civilization is credited as the model along which many other museums have been organized or restructured, including the Musée d'Orsay and the Musée du Quai Branly in Paris, Lyon's Musée des Confluences, Marseille's Musée des Civilizations de l'Europe et de la Méditerranée, the Musée d'histoire de l'Europe in Brussels and Cairo's National Museum of Egyptian Civilization.

== Later career ==
In 2001, Roland Arpin established the association that would organize the celebration of the 400th anniversary of Quebec City in 2008. He led it as the first president and general director until 2004 when changes in government at the federal, provincial and municipal level led him to retire at the age of 70. Arpin then said:

“There was some clearing work to be done; I did it. This organization had to be given momentum; that's been done. I consider that my mandate. The remaining years before 2008 will be a tug of war among the federal, provincial and municipal governments. I don't want to go through that. There are some battles I just don't feel like fighting."

Questioned about his lasting work, the Museum of Civilization that he founded and directed in Quebec City, he concluded:

“It's the synthesis of my career. It sums up my profession as an educator, my taste for quality public service and the necessary openness that we must have in the world."

== Personal life ==
Roland Arpine married Aline St-Marie in 1969. Together they were the parents of Ginette, Jacqueline and Jacques. Arpin died at the age of 76, on September 2, 2010, from Parkinson's disease.

== Awards and honours ==
- 1988 – Award of Excellence for Career as Public Administrator, l'École nationale d'administration publique "National School of Public Administration" (ENAP and ADENAP)
- 1994 – Honorary Doctorate, National Institute of Scientific Research (INRS, University of Quebec)
- 1994 – Knight of the order of Arts and Letters of the French Republic
- 1995 – Officer of Arts and Letters, of the French Republic
- 1998 – Knight of the National Order of Merit of the French Republic
- 1999 – Officer of the Ordre national du Québec
- 2000 – Officer of the National Order of Merit, of the French Republic
- 2001 – Creation of the Prix Roland-Arpin, by the Musée de la civilization – intended for students of the university programs of museology of Québec
- 2001 – Member of the Académie des Grands Québécois
- 2002 – Honorary Doctorate of Letters, Université Laval

== Selected publications ==
- La linguistique et ses applications : initiation aux études de linguistique et de littérature
- Une Politique de la culture et des arts : proposition présentée à Liza Frulla-Hébert, ministre des Affaires culturelles du Québec
- Une école centrée sur l'essentiel
- Le Musée de la civilisation : concept et pratiques
- Des musées pour aujourd'hui
- Le Musée de la civilisation. Une histoire d'amour
- La Cité du 21^{e} siècle. Le lieu de l’intelligence, Conférence, Journée thématique, Ville de Saint-Hyacinthe, le 30 mai 1998
- La fonction politique des musées
- Le musée entre la fonction politique et l'action politique, collection Les grandes conférences, Ville Saint-Laurent, Fides, 1999, 44 p., 18 x 13 cm ISBN 978-2-7621-2095-0
- Groupe de travail sur la complémentarité du secteur privé dans la poursuite des objectifs fondamentaux du système de santé au Québec, présidé par M. Roland Arpin, 1999:
1. La complémentarité du secteur privé dans la poursuite des objectifs fondamentaux du système public de santé au Québec : rapport du groupe de travail, 120 p. ISBN 2-550-34937-7;
2. La présence du privé dans la santé au Québec : état détaillé de la situation, 48 p. ISBN 2-550-34939-3;
3. Constats et recommandations sur les pistes à explorer : synthèse, 60 p. ISBN 2-550-34938-5.
- Groupe-conseil sur la politique culturelle du Québec, sous la présidence de Roland Arpin, Notre patrimoine, un présent du passé, novembre 2000, XXX-240 p. Annexes (I : Curriculum vitæ des membres du Groupe-conseil; II : Liste des organismes et des personnes rencontrées; III : Bibliographie, Liste des documents reçus, Liste des documents consultés), photos, 17 tableaux ISBN 2-550-36748-0
- Territoires culturels
