= Arpine Pehlivanian =

Lebanese Armenian classical coloratura soprano singer

Arpine Pehlivanian (Armenian: Արփինե Փեհլիվանյան, Arabic: أربين بيليفانيان; 24 April 1934 – 16 March 2004) was a Lebanese Armenian classical coloratura soprano singer who fled Lebanon during the Lebanese Civil War and resettled in the United States, where she lived in Long Beach.

== Early life and education ==
Pehlivanian graduated summa cum laude from the Lebanese National Conservatory of Piano and studied voice at the Chigiana Academy in Siena, where she earned Diplomas di Merito in Opera Interpretation, Vocal Chamber Music, and Opera Direction. She studied voice with Alvarez Boulos and Antonia Perazzi, among others.

== Career ==
She was an official soloist with the Lebanese National Symphony Orchestra for 18 years and was also Professor of Voice and Piano and Director of Opera Interpretation Studies at the Lebanese National Conservatory of Music.

After leaving Lebanon for the United States during the Lebanese Civil War, she performed for the first time in Carnegie Hall in 1974. She was the first singer from the Armenian diaspora to perform at the Yerevan Opera Theatre. In addition to operatic performances, she gave more than 800 recitals worldwide, performing works by Vivaldi, Haydn, Tigranian, Rachmaninov, Scarlatti, Mozart and others. She premiered works by many Armenian and Middle Eastern composers, including Khachaturian's Agh Tamar, which she premiered in the United States, the United Kingdom, and the Middle East.

Pehlivanian was a member of the faculty at California State University in Long Beach.

== Honors ==
- Cilician Great Cross with the rank of Knight
- Lebanese National Said-Akl Cultural Award
- Gold Medal of the Syrian Educational Ministry
- Bronze Halo Award of the Southern California Motion Picture Council (1983)
- Music Teacher's Association of California Service Award (1987)

== Personal life ==
She was the mother of conductor George Pehlivanian. Her daughter, Elizabeth Pehlivanian, is a mezzo-soprano. The three have appeared in performances together with the USC Symphony and the Pacific Symphony.

== Selected discography ==
- The Artistry of Arpine Pehlivanian (1982)
- Armenian Sacred Music (1986)
- Armenian Romance Songs (1997)
