= Arpino (disambiguation) =

Arpino may refer to a number of Italian places:

- Arpino, in the province of Frosinone
- Sant'Arpino, in the province of Caserta
- A subdivision (frazione) of Casoria, in the province of Naples

and to people:

- Gerald Arpino (1923–2008), U.S. choreographer and ballet company director
- Giovanni Arpino (1927–1987), writer and journalist
- Cavalièr d'Arpino, born Giuseppe Cesari (1568–1640), Italian Mannerist painter
