= Hindley Manufacturing =

Coordinates: 41.907026°N 71.386413°W

Hindley Manufacturing Company, Inc.

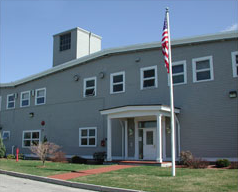
- Hindley Mfg. HQ
- Company type: Private
- Industry: Wire Hardware
- Founded: 1897 ^{1}
- Founders: Walter Hindley
- Headquarters: Cumberland, Rhode Island; United States
- Key people: Charles Hindley, President; Scott Hindley, VP of Sales
- Products: Hooks; Cotter pins Bolts
- Website: hindley.com

Hindley Manufacturing Company is an ISO 9001-2000 certified, wire-hardware manufacturer located in Cumberland, Rhode Island. The company produces a wide range of specially designed wire forms and standard wire hardware parts for number of applications and industries.

Specific products include Bright Wire and Stainless Steel Hardware, Peg hooks, Turnbuckles, Storage hooks, Plumbing Specialties, Cotter pins, Eyebolts, U-bolts, J-bolts, Screw eyes & a variety of hook types.

In 1897, the company's founder Walter Hindley, automated the manufacture of Cotter pins in a small shop near the Blackstone River north of Providence, Rhode Island. The company originally produced only Cotter pins, but then moved on to plumbing supplies. Currently, the company's main focus is on the various wire-hardware products mentioned previously.

In 1956, the company was relocated to its present-day location in Cumberland. The manufacturing facility is still privately owned by the Hindley family and encompasses over 100,000 square feet (9,300 m^{2}), a few miles from the original plant's location.
