= Arpin Group =

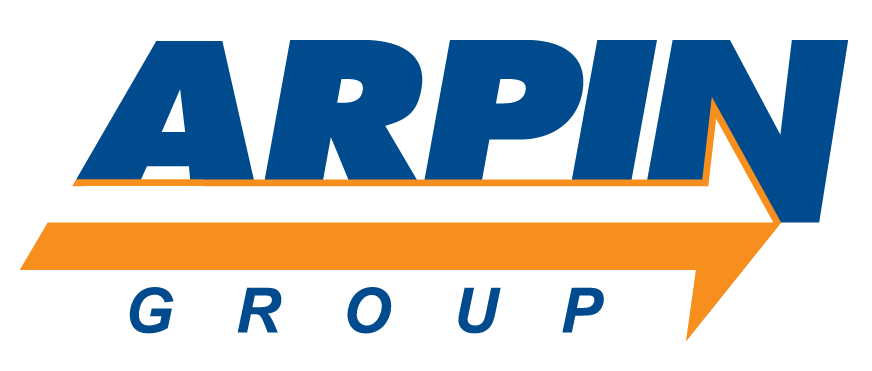
- Type: Privately owned and operated
- Industry: Moving & Storage
- Founded: 1900
- Headquarters: West Warwick, Rhode Island, United States
- Key people: David Arpin, President & CEO Peter Arpin, Executive VP
- Website: http://www.arpinintl.com

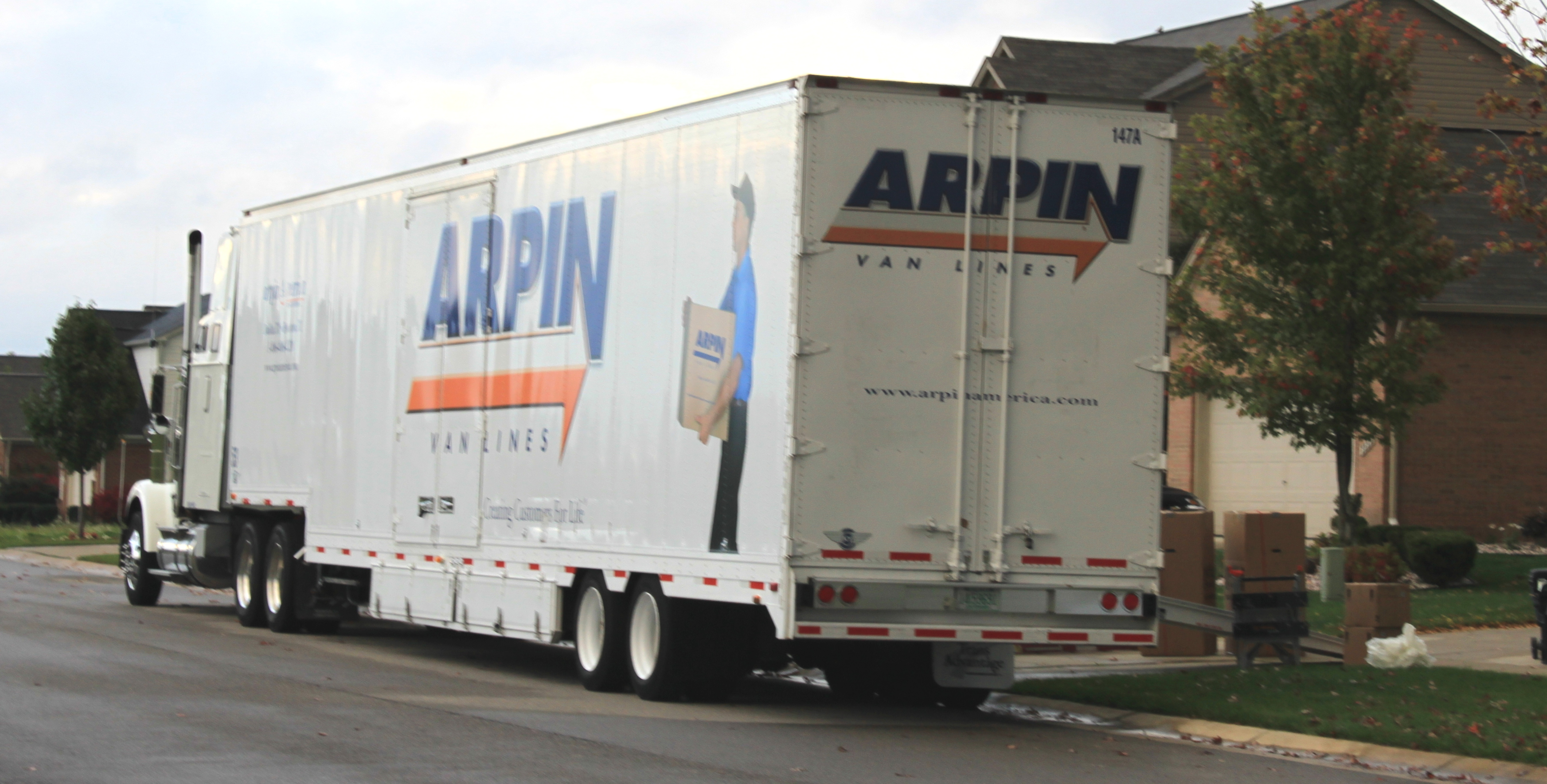
Arpin Van Lines moving van, Superior Township, Michigan

Arpin Group, Inc. is a holding company headquartered in West Warwick, Rhode Island. They provide corporate, government, military and private (C.O.D.) moving services, as well as specialized transportation services.

== Companies ==
Arpin Group is made up of multiple disparate subsidiaries, including Arpin Van Lines (formerly), Arpin International Group, Arpin Broadcasting Network, Arpin Renewable Energy, Intermodal Credit Corp, and Creative Storage Solutions. They also have major subsidiaries in Canada, Germany, Singapore, and Ireland.

Arpin International Group and Arpin Van Lines merged in 2007, creating a new subsidiary called Arpin Military Operations Center. It is used to provide monitoring services to military customers' shipments and claim settlements.

In March 2020, The Wheaton Group acquired Arpin Van Lines.
