= Big Brother Awards (United Kingdom) =

UK version of the Big Brother Awards

The Big Brother Awards (the Winston Awards) for the United Kingdom

== 1998 (first year) ==
The 1998 awards went to:

- Corporation: Procurement Services International for selling surveillance equipment to Nigeria, Turkey and Indonesia, three countries whose human rights records have been severely criticised.
- Local government: Newham Council in London won for using its 140 street cameras and facial recognition software to try to pick out criminals in crowds.
- National government: Department of Trade and Industry (DTI) over its plans for the police to have access through a third party to the keys to any information sent electronically that was locked by encryption.
- Product: Software by Harlequin that examines telephone records and is able to compare numbers dialled in order to group users into 'friendship networks' won this category. It avoids the legal requirements needed for phone tapping.
- Lifetime achievement award: Menwith Hill in Yorkshire, a listening station used by America's National Security Agency and described as the biggest US spy station in the world, won this special award.

1998 Winston Awards

- SchNEWS a Brighton-based weekly newsletter
- Lindis Percy, a Quaker, who attempts to raise awareness of the activities of the United States National Security Agency, particularly relating to Menwith Hill, (joint coordinator of the Campaign for the Accountability of American Bases)
- Alan Lodge a Nottingham photographer who spent a decade raising awareness of Police surveillance activities, particularly the practice of photographing demonstrators, activists and minority groups.

== 2000 ==
The 2000 awards were made on 4 December and went to:

- The National DNA Database—Most Invasive Proposal
- Envision Licensing Ltd—Most Invasive Company (for TV licensing)
- Javier Solana—Security-General of Council of European Union
- The NHS Executive—Most Heinous Government Organisation
- Jack Straw—Lifetime Menace

2000 Winston Awards

- Professor Jason Ditton
- The Rt Hon the Lord Cope of Berkeley
- The Manufacturing, Science and Finance Union
- Caspar Bowden
- Ben Rooney

== 2002 ==
The 2002 awards went to:

- Sir Richard Wilson—Worst Civil Servant
- Norwich Union—Most invasive company
- The National Criminal Intelligence Service (NCIS)—Most appalling project
- The Department for Education and Skills—Most heinous government organisation.
- The national identification and data sharing scheme—Lifetime menace

2002 Winston Awards

- Maurice Frankel, director of the Campaign for Freedom of Information.
- Andrew Phillips, Baron Phillips of Sudbury
- The Daily Telegraph's "Free Country Campaign".
- Ilka Schroder a German Greens Member of the European Parliament
- David Shayler

== 2003 ==
The 2003 awards went to:

- Ken Livingstone—Worst Civil Servant
- Capita—Most invasive company
- PIU Data Sharing Report—Most appalling project
- Association of Chief Police Officers(ACPO)—Most heinous government organisation.
- Tony Blair—Lifetime menace
- David Blunkett—"Dog Poo On A Stick" prize

2003 Winston Awards

- Posthumously, to Dr Roger Needham
- Teri Dowty, Joint national coordinator, Children's Rights Alliance for England and Wales
- Marion Chester, Legal Director, Association of Community Health Councils of England and Wales
- Stand insurance blog
- Richard Norton-Taylor and Stuart Millar of The Guardian
- Undercurrents

== 2008 ==
A single Big Brother award was won by New Labour.

2008 Winston Awards

- Baroness Sarah Ludford
- Phil Booth, National Coordinator of NO2ID
- Helen Wallace, executive director of GeneWatch UK
- Gareth Crossman, retiring Director of Policy at Liberty.
- Becky Hogge, retiring executive director of the Open Rights Group.
- David Davis

== See also ==
- Privacy International
