= Free UK Genealogy =

British volunteer genealogical organisation

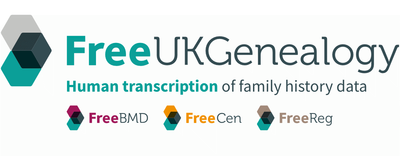

Free UK Genealogy is a charitable incorporated organisation (CIO) acting as an umbrella organisation for FreeBMD, FreeREG and FreeCEN. The charity was formerly known as FreeBMD.

Free UK Genealogy works with volunteers to make transcriptions of family history records. Current projects include transcribing the England and Wales index of Births, Marriages and Deaths, historic Parish Registers and 19th Century Censuses. The resulting databases, FreeBMD, FreeCEN and FreeREG, and transcripts are free to access.

== Formation of Free UK Genealogy from FreeBMD ==
FreeBMD was founded in 1998 by Ben Laurie, Graham Hart, and Camilla Gemmingen von Massenbach after they realised the potential that the online genealogy community had to make records accessible to support research. Volunteers came together online to transcribe the General Register Office (GRO) indexes of Births, Marriages and Deaths for England and Wales. Work continues to complete a transcription database covering the indexes from 1837 to 1983. All three founders are still actively involved with supporting and managing the organisation.

- In 2003, the organisation registered as a charity under the name FreeBMD.
- In 2014, the name was changed to Free UK Genealogy, which better reflected the organisation.
- In 2016, Free UK Genealogy became a CIO (Charitable Incorporated Organisation).

== Governance ==
In 2013, Darren Wright was appointed executive director, in succession to Nick Barratt.

Pat Reynolds is the current executive director, in post since June 2015.

== Ethos and mission ==
Free UK Genealogy is a supporter of Open Data and Open Source as key to making and keeping public records accessible to all.

In 2011, FreeBMD partnered with the Open Rights Group and Open Knowledge Foundation to launch the Open Genealogy Alliance (OGA). The OGA researches the genealogy sector and the copyright status of digitised public domain documents.

Free UK Genealogy work is generally licensed under the Creative Commons CC0 Public Domain Dedication, as described in the footer of the website.

== Awards and recognition ==
In 2007, FreeBMD was awarded the Prince Michael of Kent Award by the Society of Genealogists. The same year, The Guardian selected FreeBMD as one of the 50 best family history websites.

Family Tree Magazine named Free UK Genealogy among the 101 Best websites for British & Irish Genealogy in 2016.

In June 2017, Free BMD was selected as one of UK Family Tree magazine's 50 best websites for family history.

Free UK Genealogy's projects are often recommended as a good place to begin researching family history.

== Volunteers ==
The majority of the work of Free UK Genealogy is carried out by volunteers, from transcribing records to managing the databases. As of March 2016, the organisation had 6,500 active volunteers.

Volunteers are trained and supported in their work.
