= 27th National Geographic Bee =

2015 American academic competition

- Date: May 11–13, 2015
- Location: Washington, D.C.
- Winner: Karan Menon (14 at time of win)
- No. of contestants: 54

The 27th National Geographic Bee was held on May 11–13, 2015 in Washington, District of Columbia. It is sponsored by the National Geographic Society. Soledad O'Brien was the host for the second and final time. The winner was Karan Menon of John Adams Middle School in Edison, New Jersey, who won $50,000 in scholarships, a trip for 2 to the Galapagos Islands, and a lifetime membership to the National Geographic Society. The runner-up was Shriya Yarlagadda of Grand Blanc East Middle School in Grand Blanc, Michigan who won a $25,000 scholarship. The Third place winner was Sojas Wagle of Springdale, Arkansas, who won $10,000 in scholarships. Finishing in 4th place was Tejas Badgujar of Pennsylvania. The competition started with the school level rounds, in which more than 5 million students competed in 11,000 schools across the nation. Other students who placed in the top ten include Kapil Nathan of Alabama, Nicholas Monahan of Idaho, Patrick Taylor of Iowa, Abhinav Karthikeyan of Maryland, Lucy Chae of Massachusetts, and Shreyas Varathan of Minnesota. The Florida State Champion, Rishi Nair, became the 2016 National Geographic Bee Champion. The winners of the school bees then took a written qualification test to see who could qualify for the state level competition. The top 100 or so scorers on the qualification test in each state were selected to go for the state championship. The winners of the state championship would then get $100 in cash, a National Geographic 10th Edition Atlas, and the opportunity to represent their state in the National Finals held in Washington, DC.

== 2015 state representatives ==
The state representatives from each of the 50 U.S. states, Atlantic territories, Pacific territories, and Department of Defense dependents schools was determined on March 27, 2015 at the state level competitions.

State	Name	School	City/Town	Grade	Place
Alabama	Kapil Nathan	Mount Laurel Elementary School	Birmingham	5th	T-9th
Alaska	Ben Ng	Floyd Dryden Middle School	Juneau	7th	
Arizona	Cameron Danesh	On Track Academy	Scottsdale	8th	
Arkansas	Sojas Wagle	South West Junior High School	Springdale	8th	3rd
(Puerto Rico) (United States Virgin Islands) Atlantic Territories	Christopher Sharpless	Antilles School	Saint Thomas, U.S. Virgin Islands	8th	
California	Madhavan Krishnan	Sam H. Lawson Middle School	Cupertino	6th	
Colorado	William Jacob (Jake) Hofgard	Louisville Middle School	Louisville	7th	
Connecticut	Alexander Koutsoukos	Middlebrook Middle School	Wilton	7th	
Delaware	Rohan Kanchana	Newark Charter School	Newark	6th	
Department of Defense	Ethan Cooper	Menwith Hill Elementary/High School	Menwith Hill, United Kingdom	8th	
District of Columbia	Jacob Wall	British School of Washington	District of Columbia	6th	
Florida	Rishi Nair	Lincoln Magnet School	Plant City	5th	
Georgia	Vibhav Kanyadan	The Walker School	Marietta	7th	
Hawaii	Mika Ishii	Kaimuki Middle School	Honolulu	7th	
Idaho	Nicholas Monahan	Payette Lakes Middle School	McCall	6th	7th
Illinois	Alexandru Grindeanu	Gower Middle School	Burr Ridge	8th	
Indiana	Thomas Gatewood	Western Middle School	Russiaville	8th	
Iowa	Patrick Taylor	Northwest Junior High School	Coralville	7th	T-5th
Kansas	Chinmay Patil	California Trail Middle School	Olathe	7th	
Kentucky	Pranav Kanmadikar	Meyzeek Middle School	Louisville	6th	
Louisiana	Ajaya Tummala	Caddo Middle Magnet School	Shreveport	8th	
Maine	Matthew Chase	Wells Junior High School	Wells	8th	
Maryland	Abhinav Karthikeyan	Clearspring Elementary School	Damascus	6th	T-5th
Massachusetts	Inwook (Lucy) Chae	Charles E. Brown Middle School	Newton Center	7th	8th
Michigan	Shriya Yarlagadda	Grand Blanc East Middle School	Grand Blanc	6th	2nd
Minnesota	Shreyas Varathan	Shakopee Area Catholic School	Shakopee	8th	T-9th
Mississippi	Ian Espy	St. Andrews Episcopal School	Ridgeland	8th	
Missouri	Nikhil Krishnan	Rockwood South Middle School	Fenton	7th	
Montana	Grace Rembert	Sacajawea Middle School	Bozeman	7th	
Nebraska	Brendan Pennington	Prairie Lane Elementary School	Omaha	6th	
Nevada	Brian Montes	Adobe Middle School	Elko	8th	
New Hampshire	Issac Stearns	Kearsarge Regional Middle School	North Sutton	7th	
New Jersey	Karan Menon	John Adams Middle School	Edison	8th	1st
New Mexico	Lakshay Sood	Manzano Day School	Albuquerque	4th	
New York	Arnav Patra	Heim Middle School	Williamsville	7th	
North Carolina	Ian Garnto	West Alexander Middle School	Taylorsville	8th	
North Dakota	Sean Ness	Valley Middle School	Grand Forks	6th	
Ohio	Suyash Dixit	Shananan Middle School	Lewis Center	8th	
Oklahoma	Grant Talkington	Brink Junior High School	Oklahoma City	7th	
Oregon	Ashwin Sivakumar	Oregon Episcopal School	Portland	5th	
(American Samoa) (Guam) (Northern Mariana Islands) Pacific Territories	Ethan Thomas Storie	Bishop Baumgartner Memorial Catholic School	Sinajana	8th	
Pennsylvania	Tejas Badgujar	Hampton Middle School	Allison Park	8th	4th
Rhode Island	Eli Fulton	Rhode Island of Home Educators (Home School)	Rumford	7th	
South Carolina	Nicholas Gringat	St Anne's School	Rockhill	8th	
South Dakota	Damian Hierrera	Dakota Valley Middle School	North Sioux City	8th	
Tennessee	John Webster	Evangelical Christian School Macon	Cordova	7th	
Texas	Joseph Afuso	Bishop Garriga Middle School	Corpus Christi	8th	
Utah	Gauri Garg	Bear River Charter School	North Logan	8th	
Vermont	David Liebowitz	Weybridge Elementary School	Weybridge	6th	
Virginia	Alexander Perdue	Andrew Lewis Middle School	Salem	8th	
Washington	Nick Harrington	Lakeside Middle School	Seattle	8th	
West Virginia	Hunter Midcap	St. Michael Parrish School	Wheeling	6th	
Wisconsin	Joshua Frank	Fall River School	Fall River	7th	
Wyoming	Annika Coberly	Upton Middle School	Upton	8th	

== Final round ==
The 10 Finalists in this year's Final round were Nicholas Monahan from Idaho, Karan Menon from New Jersey, Sojas Wagle from Arkansas, Abhinav Karthikeyan from Maryland, Patrick Taylor from Iowa, Lucy Chae from Massachusetts, Kapil Nathan from Alabama, Shreyas Varathan from Minnesota, Shriya Yarlagadda from Michigan, and Tejas Badgujar from Pennsylvania. This years finals had many new changes including a 45-second oral response, a series of 3 questions asked at the US Botanical Gardens, and lightning rounds, where a finalist would get 3 questions in a row, with only 6 seconds to answer each. In one of these rounds, Karan, the state champion of New Jersey was asked "The Mesabi range contains a large deposit of what metal-bearing mineral?" Karan's answer of taconite was originally marked wrong (the given answer was iron ore), but later he would object and prove to the judges that his answer was correct. Shriya Yarlagadda, from Michigan maintained a perfect score throughout most of the competition. In the end, the top 2 students were Karan of New Jersey and Shriya of Michigan. Karan got a perfect score of 7/7 in the championship round, while Shriya only missed the first question. "Mariupol, a city located at the mouth of the Kalmius River, is located on what sea that is an arm of the Black Sea?" Answer: "Sea of Azov." The final question that clinched the win for Karan was "If completed, the proposed Grand Inga Dam would become the world’s largest hydropower plant. This dam would be built near Inga Falls on which African river?" Answer: "Congo River." The Third place winner was Sojas Wagle of Springdale, Arkansas, who won $10,000 in scholarships. Finishing in 4th place was Tejas Badgujar of Allison Park, Pennsylvania.
