= Caspar Bowden =

British privacy advocate (1961 – 2015)

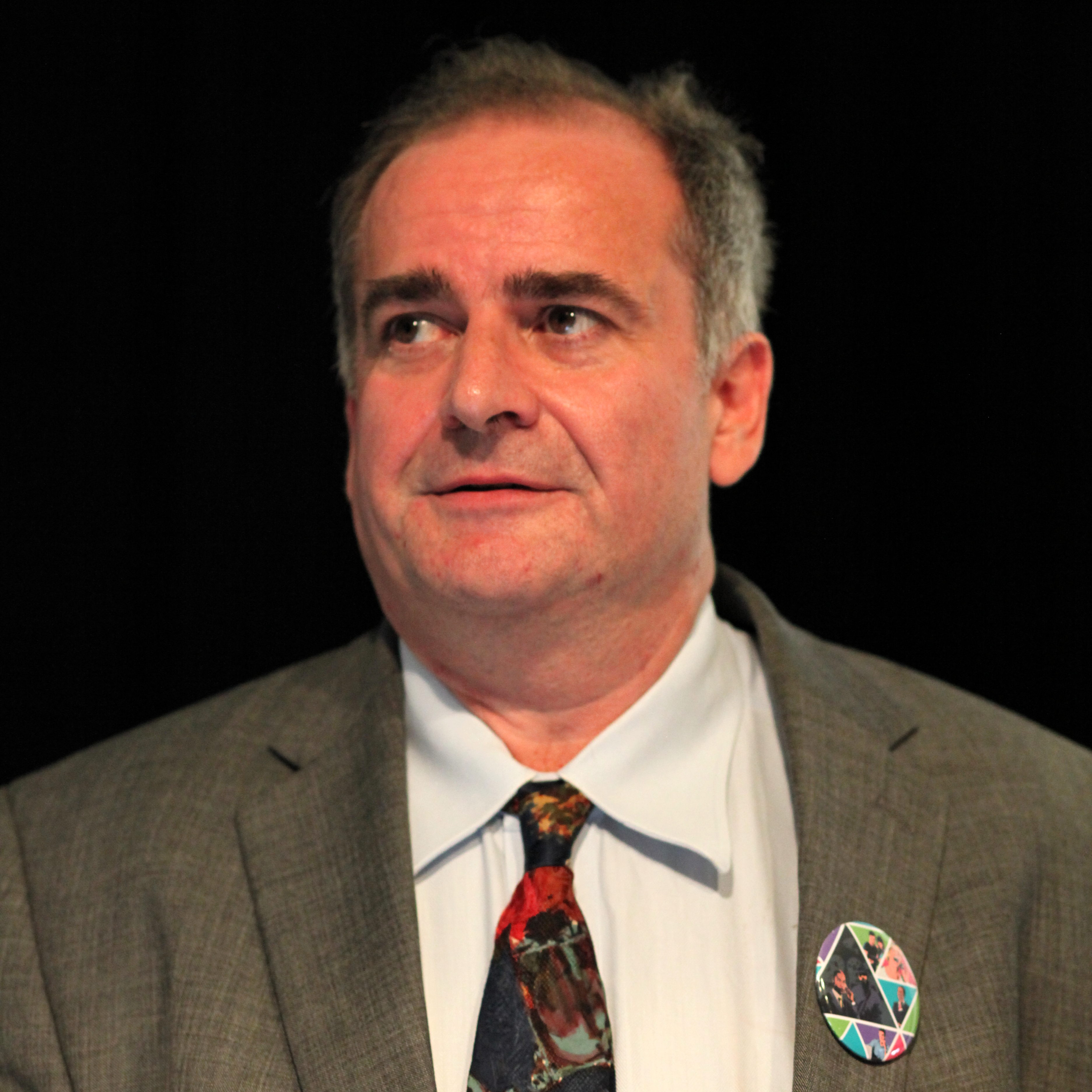
- Caspar Bowden at the Congress on Privacy & Surveillance (2013) of the École Polytechnique Fédérale de Lausanne
- Born: 19 August 1961; London
- Died: 9 July 2015 (aged 53); Saint-Gaudens, Haute-Garonne, France
- Education: Magdalene College, Cambridge
- Known for: Humans Rights and privacy advocacy
- Political party: Labour
- Spouse: Sandi Bowden
- Relatives: Simon Bowden (brother); Malcolm Bowden (brother)
- Awards: Winston award (2000)

Signature
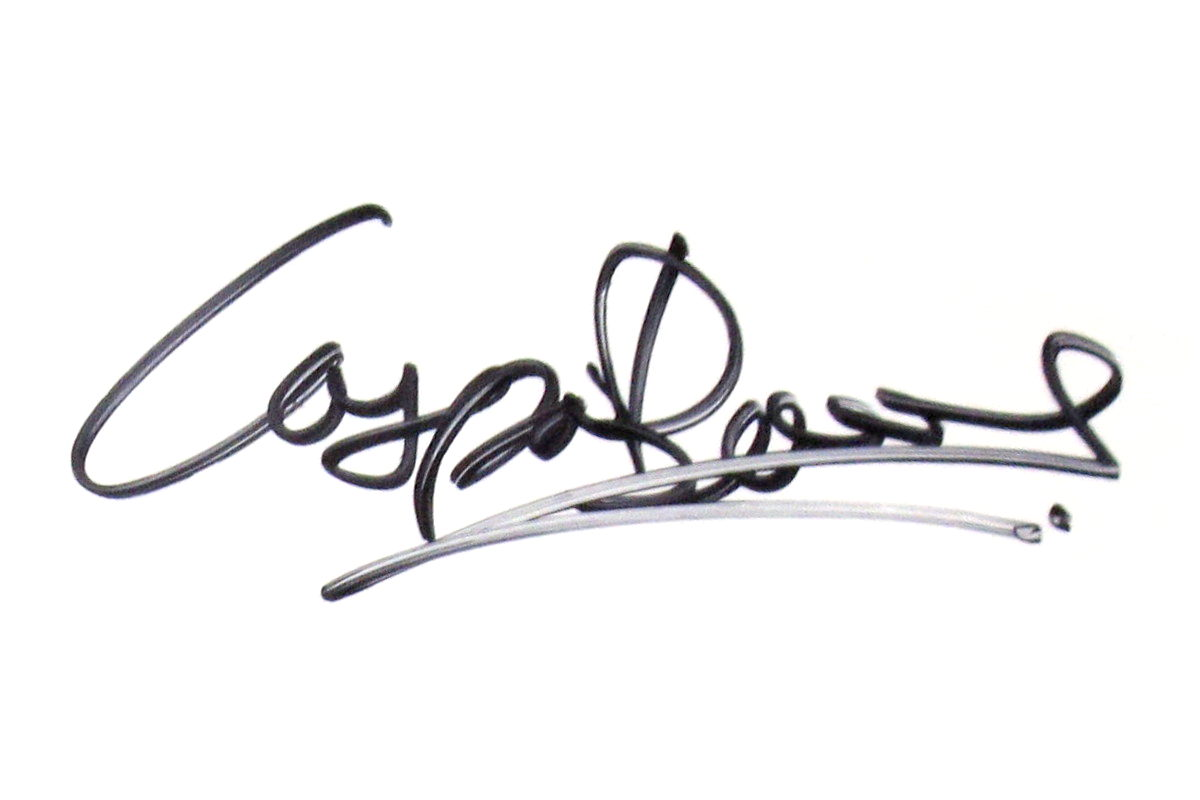

Caspar Pemberton Scott Bowden (19 August 1961 – 9 July 2015) was a British privacy advocate, formerly a chief privacy adviser at Microsoft. Styled as "an independent advocate for information privacy rights, and public understanding of privacy research in computer science", he was on the board of the Tor anonymity service. and a fellow of the British Computer Society. Having predicted US mass surveillance programmes such as PRISM from open sources, he gathered renewed attention after the Snowden leaks vindicated his warnings.

== Biography ==
Born in London, Bowden was educated first at Westminster Under School (1970–74) where he already showed precociousness in the sciences, and then at the prestigious Westminster School (1974-9) and then studied Mathematics at Magdalene College in Cambridge. He dropped out and worked as an independent entrepreneur in technology before joining Goldman Sachs.

Bowden served on the Executive Committee of Scientists for Labour and helped shape the stance of the Labour Party on the matter. In 1997, he entered the world of privacy advocacy when he attended the first Scrambling for Safety event, in response to the UK government's plans for key-escrow encryption, organised by Simon Davies at the London School of Economics. After the Labour won power in 1997 and reneged on its promises, considering instead to enforce mandatory cryptographic backdoors, Bowden co-founded the Foundation for Information Policy Research (FIPR) in May 1998. He became its first director, earning the Winston award in 2000 for his work against the Regulation of Investigatory Powers Act 2000.

In 2002, Bowden joined Microsoft; he served as a Senior Privacy Strategist for Europe, the Middle East and Africa (not the US) until 2004, and became a Chief Privacy Advisor, Microsoft EMEA Technology Office, UK in 2005. In 2007, Bowden lead "the privacy pillar of the Trustworthy Computing initiative across Europe, Middle-East and Africa for Microsoft". During his tenure, he expressed vocal opposition against the Human Rights discrimination between US citizens and foreigners enforced by the Foreign Intelligence Surveillance Act, which he dubbed being "guilty of being a foreigner". His public advocacy led to his dismissal from Microsoft in 2011, after he stated that "If you sell Microsoft cloud computing to your own governments then this law (FISA) means that NSA can conduct unlimited mass surveillance on that data."

In 2012, prior to the Snowden leaks, he co-authored the Note on privacy and Cloud computing, forewarning that the USA used European reliance on cloud computing services to monitor its data. After Snowden's disclosures vindicated him, he criticised PRISM, stating he had suspected the existence of the project during his time at Microsoft, although he had not known it by name.

In 2013, Bowden authored the 2013 European Parliament inquiry briefing on the US FISA law, The US surveillance programmes and their impact on EU citizens' fundamental rights, In an interview to The Guardian, he stated that he did not trust Microsoft. Instead, he advocated the use of Tor and Qubes OS, and stated he had eliminated all Microsoft products from his software stack, opting for free software, and stopped using a mobile phone. In October, he joined the Advisory Council of the Open Rights Group.

In winter 2014, he gave a talk on the subject at the 31st Chaos Communication Congress in Hamburg, The Cloud Conspiracy, detailing how he had worked out the shape of PRISM from open sources, and the lack of reaction to his warnings to European Union institutions.

A resident of London and Toulouse, Bowden died of melanoma in Saint-Gaudens, Haute-Garonne France on 9 July 2015 at the age of 53. He was survived by his wife Sandi, and brothers Malcolm and Simon. Jacob Appelbaum reported that on his deathbed, Bowden asked "that we work to ensure equal protection regardless of nationality". He was posthumously awarded the Liberty Lifetime Achievement Award (2015) and EFF Pioneer Award (2015).

The Caspar Bowden Legacy Fund for privacy advocacy and technology was founded on 12 July, with an initial staff comprising Bart Preneel (Katholieke Universiteit Leuven), Claudia Diaz (Katholieke Universiteit Leuven), Roger Dingledine (The Tor Project, Inc) and George Danezis (University College London).

== Works ==
- Bowden, Caspar: "Closed Circuit Television For Inside Your Head: Blanket Traffic Data Retention and the Emergency Anti-Terrorism Legislation ", Computer and Telecommunications Law Review, March 2002.
- N. Robinson, H. Graux, M. Botterman, L. Valeri: Review of the European Data Protection Directive (interviewee)
- Bowden, Caspar (2 October 2013). The US surveillance programmes and their impact on EU citizens' fundamental rights (PDF). Policy Department C: Citizens' Rights And Constitutional Affairs, European Parliament, European Union. p. 40.
- Bowden, Caspar: "The Cloud Conspiracy 2008–2014: how the EU was hypnotised that the NSA did not exist" (video), 31st Chaos Communication Congress (31C3)
- Bowden, Caspar: Chapter Five Part I: Data preservation instead of data retention, chapter of Why the Snoopers’ Charter is the wrong approach: A call for targeted and accountable investigatory powers, report of the Open Rights Group.

== Remembrances ==
"Combative and prickly, Caspar was also unfailingly kind and generous...Caspar was a big believer in a Rawlsian model of justice, a stickler when it came to the universality of human rights and was unstinting in his criticism of corporate or government entities or agents who sought to undermine those rights and principles. He was prepared to wrestle with the user unfriendly inconveniences of privacy enhancing technologies, as the almost meltdown of his laptop, four minutes into his 'Reflections on Mistrusting Trust' talk at QCon last summer, demonstrated." - Ray Corrigan, senior lecturer in technology at the Open University

"(He) was a fervent believer in privacy, and technology's role in creating and ensuring it. He hacked legislation to see what it was that governments were trying to do and called them on it, was then labelled paranoid, until proven right down the road. He foresaw Tempora, Prism....I'm gutted we will be without him in the coming debates over the Investigatory Powers Bill...He would have been the intellectual powerhouse and a forceful critic of all who fell short in the defense of privacy." - Gus Hosein of Privacy International

"I remember clearly the first time I saw Caspar Bowden. It was spring 2011, and he had just shot a bolt of electricity through a dusty seminar on online privacy with a passionate invective on sham anonymization of datasets that went into idiocy-explainer levels of detail about how current U.K. data protection law was being a complete ass." - Natasha Lomas, techcrunch

" I met Caspar in 2001 while working for EFF; he was working for the Foundation for Internet Policy Research, which tirelessly lobbied the Lords and Parliament on the new surveillance powers that the Blair government wanted to bring in...He was tireless, fierce, and had an encyclopedic knowledge of privacy legislation, regulation, and technology. He went to Microsoft for a while to be their main privacy advocate, beat his brains out on that gig, walked out with his head held high, and went back to shit-disturbing for activist groups." - Cory Doctorow, boingboing

"I think I first met Caspar Bowden back in 2007...I first encountered him at privacy conferences, where he would, without fail, be the first person to the microphone anytime a tech company employee or government official spoke, and he would hammer them with the most uncomfortable, probing questions about privacy and surveillance." - Christopher Soghoian, security and privacy researcher

"I met Caspar Bowden for the first time back in 2013 when he was visiting Warsaw for a privacy conference. I was expecting to meet another boring policy/legal person, but that expectation was quickly revisited. First, he surprised me by pulling his laptop, which turned out to be running… yes, that’s correct: Qubes OS!" - Joanna Rutkowska

"Very few people I know can combine a rigorous grasp of first principles and unswerving moral sense with the ruthless attention to detail and relentless practicality required to do something about them all. Caspar could. And did." - Phil Booth, of the NO2ID campaign

"Caspar was to me, a great friend and a mentor but more than that he was a beacon in what is a very lonely sea - there are not many of us fighting these issues but when we find each other we make each other stronger - Caspar made me stronger. Like me, Caspar was more interested in fighting the issues than who he might upset along the way - it made him a controversial figure but his intelligence, commitment and knowledge were without question." - Alexander Hanff, CEO, Think Privacy

"Yes, he could be abrupt, and yes, he often 'bent' convention by asking direct and probing questions in ways that risked alienating the policymakers he sought to influence. But I never saw him do so rudely, inappropriately, or in a way that demonstrated anything less than total integrity. That took strong moral principles, intellectual rigour, and courage." - Robin Wilton, Senior Advisor for Internet Trust, Internet Technology Office, Internet Society

"Where others would have been slowed down by false reassurance, or given up in the face of intimidating detail, Caspar would read the legislation, read the code, understand the context, and keep going until he had a way forward. Once the analysis was clear, and the solution formulated, he would set about communicating it, with the same dogged enthusiasm."- Ben Goldacre

"Over the years, we met on the same conference circuit, surrounded by the usual suspects. We’d share our frustration about legal developments and government idiocy. He’d rant about 'charlatans and crooks', 'sinister drafting', 'disingenuous politicians'. He’d draw diagrams on paper napkins when excited, wanting to show someone how TOR worked. Jump up and gesticulate wildly, as if solving a Rubik’s cube, describing YouProve and anonymous credentials. He boycotted conferences he’d urged me to attend (after I’d bought my flights) on grounds that the sponsors were evil. He could be brilliant on stage and a troll when in the audience, banging on about US exceptionalism and FISA. He’d confess to me after that he may have gone too far, but it was better than not having idiot bureaucrats understand fundamentals. He wasn’t a lawyer, but had a finer legal mind than most." - Malavika Jayaram, Executive Director of Digital Asia Hub

"In the roughly 20 years I knew him, which encompassed his ten years trying to implement privacy at Microsoft, I never heard him mention family other than his wife. He argued with everyone: "Prickly for the right reasons," a friend said on hearing the news. I was astonished and flattered when, years afterwards, he told me that one of the things that led him into the politics of cryptography was articles I wrote in the early 1990s. Moments like that can keep a writer motivated for decades." - Wendy M. Grossman, 2013 Enigma Award winner
