= Ada Lovelace Day =

Annual event celebrating the contributions of women to STEM fields

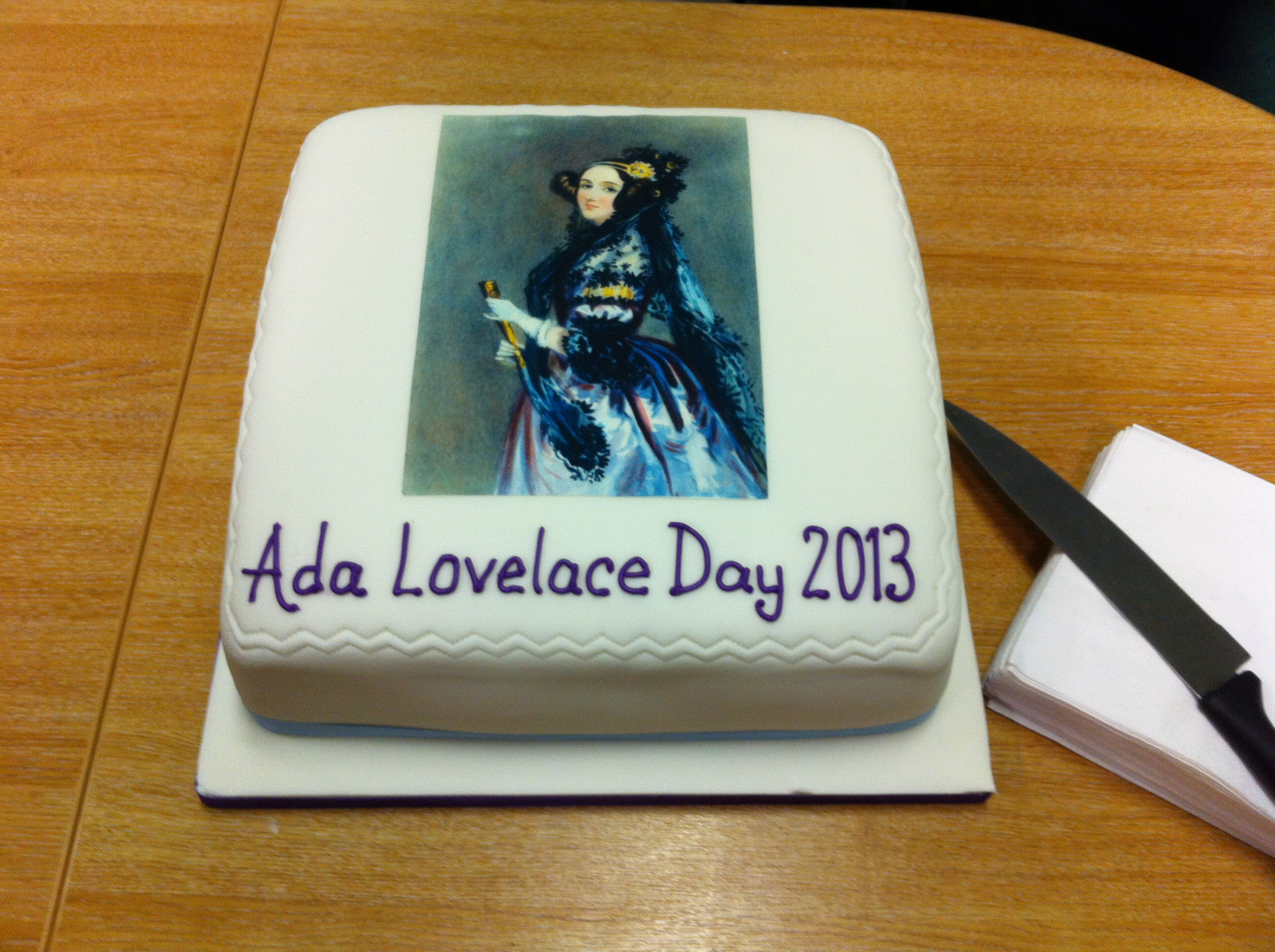
Cake made to celebrate Ada Lovelace Day at a 2013 Edit-a-thon held in Oxford, England

Ada Lovelace Day is an annual event held on the second Tuesday of October to celebrate and raise awareness of the contributions of women to STEM fields. It is named after mathematician and computer science pioneer Ada Lovelace. It started in 2009 as a "day of blogging" and has since become a multi-national event with conferences.

== History ==
The day was founded in the United Kingdom in 2009 by Suw Charman-Anderson on the second Tuesday in October as a means of raising awareness about the contributions of women to science, technology, engineering, and mathematics (STEM) fields.

Charman-Anderson later said of this:

I launched Ada Lovelace Day in 2009 because I felt passionately that we needed a way to celebrate and highlight women's work and achievements in STEM, which frequently don't get the recognition they deserve.

— Suw Charman-Anderson, 2023

In 2022, Charman-Anderson announced that this would be the last year in which the organization that she founded, Finding Ada, would organize an annual flagship Ada Lovelace Day event in England. However, the Royal Institution stepped in with funding, due to its alignment with their mission to bring scientists and the public together.

Since its inception, Ada Lovelace Day has become international in scope, with events organized by groups ranging from museums, professional societies, universities, colleges and high schools. While Ada Lovelace Day is the second Tuesday of October, events celebrating women in STEM typically span the period of October and November, and include diverse activities ranging from in-person and virtual Wikipedia Editathons to panel discussions and film screenings.

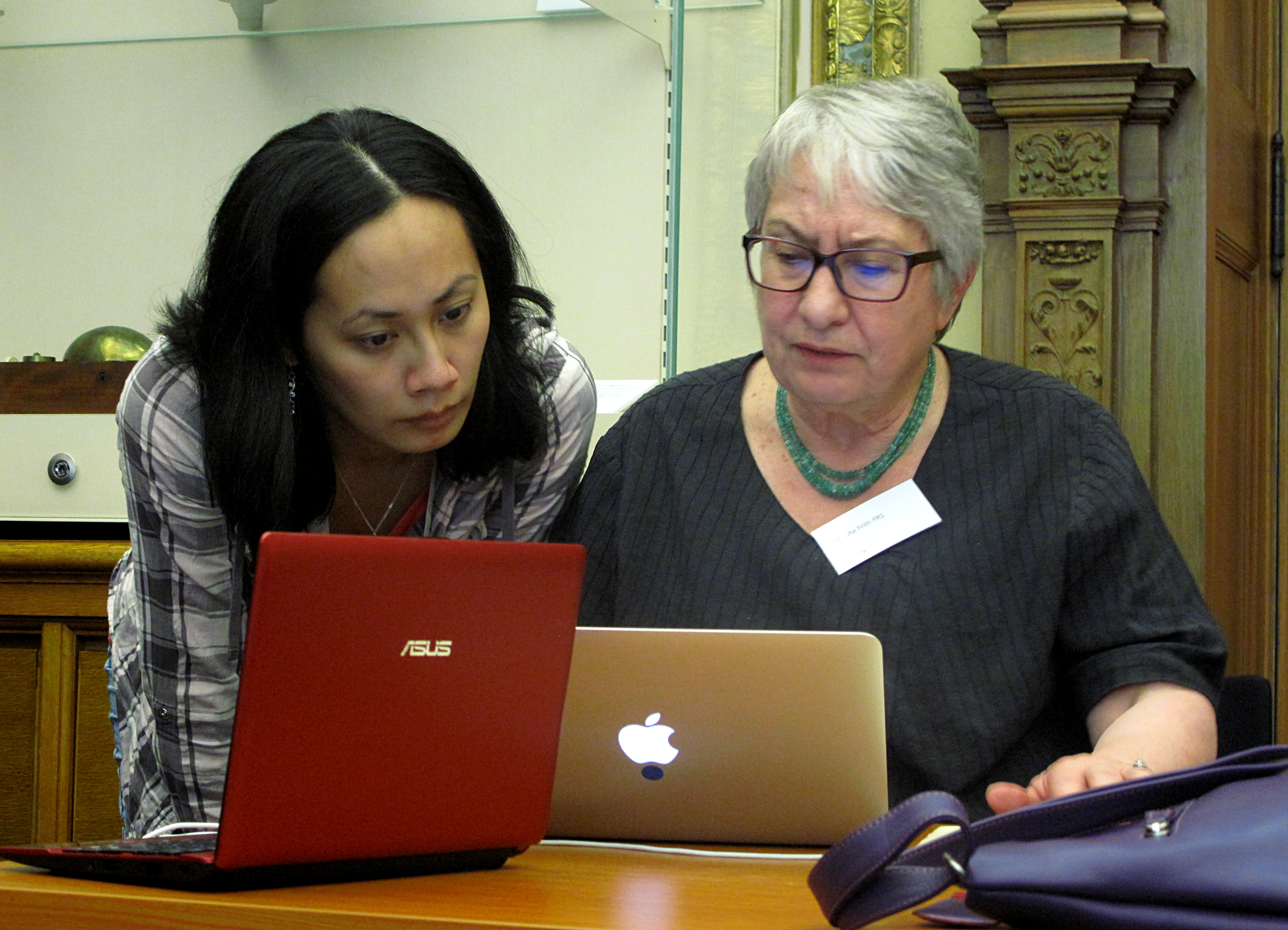
Participants Uta Frith and Katie Chan at an Ada Lovelace Day event sponsored by Wikimedia UK in 2012

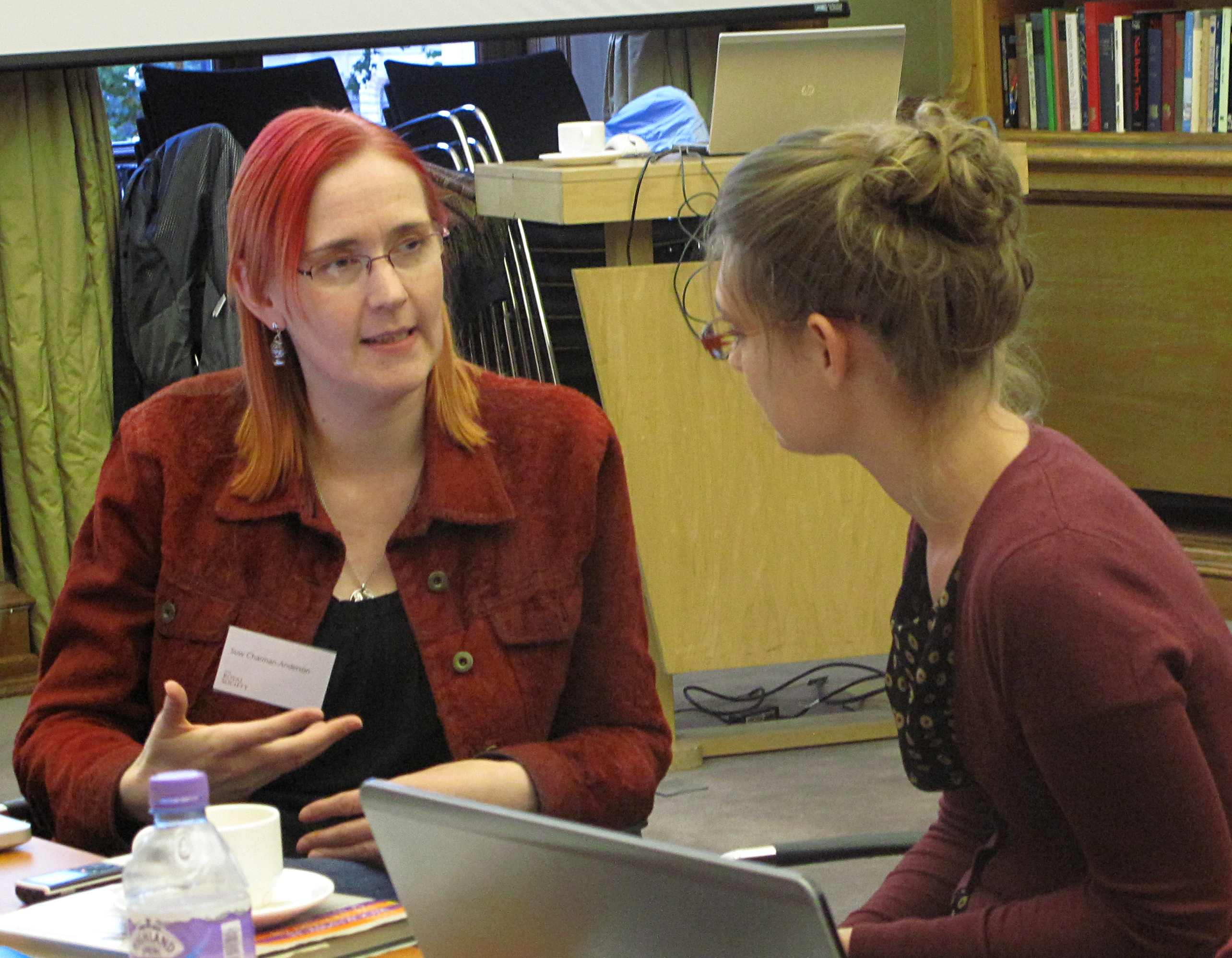
Suw Charman-Anderson, founder of Ada Lovelace Day, at an event in 2012

While this celebration of the often overlooked contributions of women in STEM was named for Ada Lovelace, activities have expanded since 2009 to highlight the diverse contributions of women in STEM over time and different countries. Events have featured policy initiatives and scholarship relating to equity, diversity and inclusion that provide spaces and platforms for dialogue and discussion about how unconscious bias(es) function to create barriers to women's participation and advancement in the professional fields of STEM.
