= Suw Charman-Anderson =

British journalist, consultant and blogger

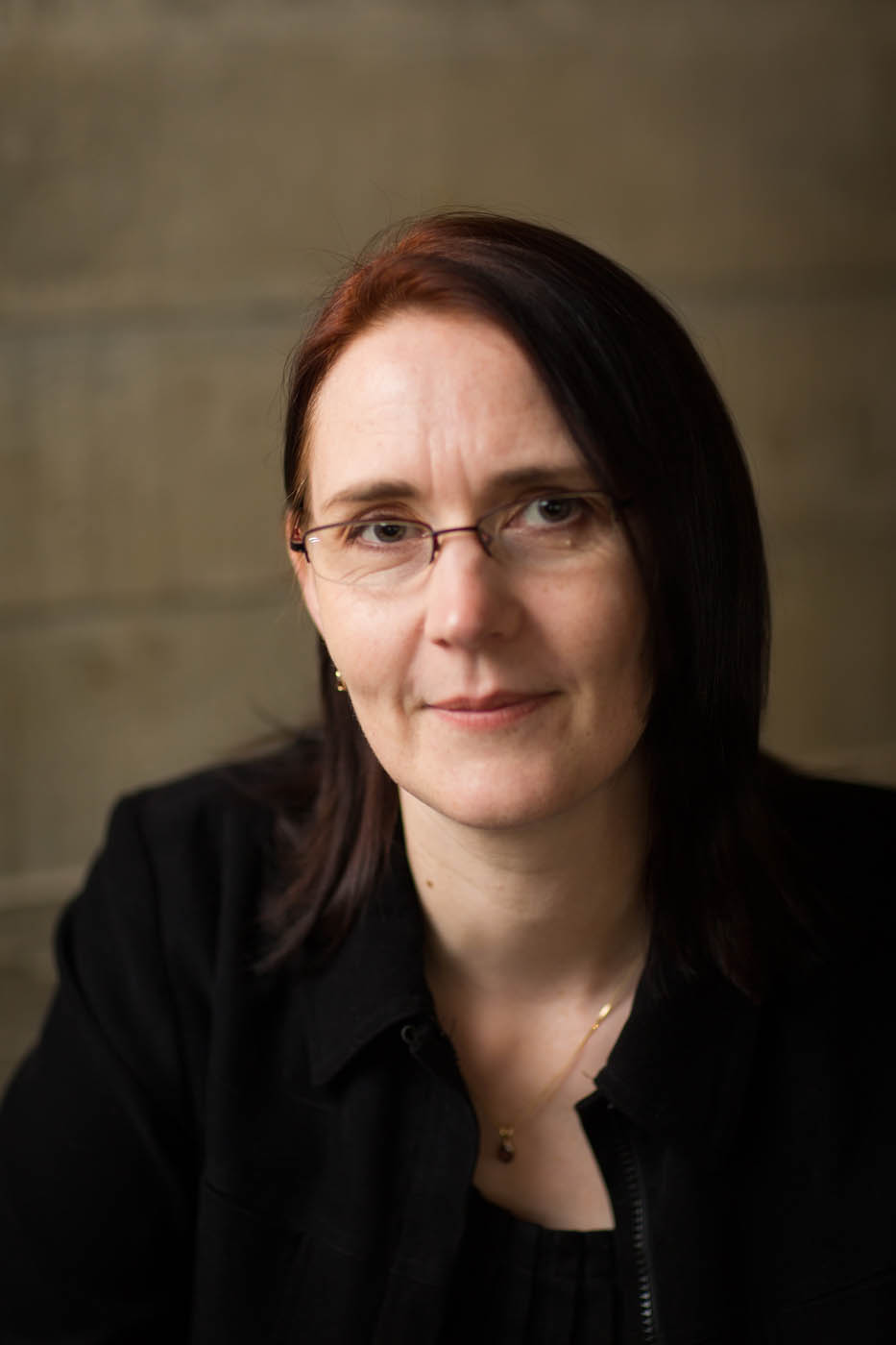
- Born: 15 April 1971 (age 55); Bournemouth, Hampshire (now Dorset), England, UK
- Occupations: Journalist, writer, consultant, campaigner
- Spouse: Kevin Anderson (2008–present)
- Website: suw.charman-anderson.com

Suw Charman-Anderson (born 15 April 1971) is the former Executive Director of the Open Rights Group, a campaign group based in London. She is also a journalist, social software consultant, blogger and public speaker. Named one of the "50 most influential Britons in technology" by The Daily Telegraph, she has also worked to gain recognition for other women in technological fields, including by founding Ada Lovelace Day.

== Career ==
=== Early career, blogging, and social software ===
Charman is a graduate of Cardiff University with a BSc in Geology. Early career projects included music journalism, web publishing, and providing web support to other learners of Welsh. In her 20s, while working as an editorial assistant for a science publishing company, she chose the name "Suw" for herself after creating it as a typographical error for her short name, Sue. Her personal weblog, Chocolate and Vodka, started in June 2002, features commentary on the Blogosphere, social issues and politics growing her audience. Her professional blog Strange Attractor, was begun in July 2004 under the Corante label. She still edits and posts to both, the latter with her husband Kevin.

Her work in Social Software consulting includes producing the BlogOn Conference in New York City, in 2005. She has worked for MSN, BUPA, Dresdner Kleinwort Wasserstein, Socialtext, Jackie Cooper PR, De Montfort University and BBC News Online, training or consulting. She talks about blogging for business. In January 2012, she started a blog on Forbes.com about self-publishing and crowdfunding.

=== Activism ===
Her work online has led her to explore the issues surrounding rights and responsibilities online, which she has frequently written about—for example, her article for The Guardian in 2004 exploring the truth behind file sharing and the music industry. She also has written for Linux User and Developer discussing digital rights.

In 2005, she co-founded the Open Rights Group, leading the project as Executive Director within its infancy. As a founder of ORG, she has commented on a wide variety of issues dealing with ownership and new media.

=== Ada Lovelace Day ===
In 2009, Charman recruited bloggers and others to honour influential women in science, technology, engineering and maths (STEM). This became an annual event, which she called Ada Lovelace Day. In 2010 more than 2,000 people responded with blogs, podcasts, and videos supporting the project. In 2015, it was said to be important to women and minorities under-represented in science and technology.

== Bibliography ==
- Argleton, London 2010. ASIN B005JSI21W
- Molly’s Secret Diary or the Confessions of a Social Software Convert; in: Willms Buhse/Soeren Stamer: The Art of Letting Go, Bloomington 2008. ISBN 978-1-4401-0809-9
- in: Jeremy Wright: Blog Marketing: The Revolutionary New Way to Increase Sales, Build Your Brand, and Get Exceptional Results, New York 2006. ISBN 0-07-226251-6
- "Blogs in Business: Using Blogs behind the Firewall", in: Axel Bruns; Joanne Jacobs: Uses of Blogs, New York 2006. ISBN 978-0-8204-8124-1
