= FreeBMD =

UK vital records website

- FreeBMD logo
- Website type: Vital records transcription, search and viewing
- Founded: 1998
- Area served: England and Wales
- Owner: Free UK Genealogy CIO
- Founders: Ben Laurie, Graham Hart and Camilla Von Massenbach
- Website: freebmd.org.uk
- Advertising: Yes
- Commercial: No
- Registration: Viewing: No; Transcribing: Yes
- Native clients on: Windows (WinBMD, BMDVerify), Mac (MacBMD-X), Linux (linBMD), DOS SpeedBMD (defunct)
- Written in: Perl, MySQL
- OCLC number: 1150886645

FreeBMD is a website which coordinates and provides free transcriptions of the indexes to births, marriages and deaths (BMD) registrations held by the General Register Office for England and Wales (GRO). It also provides a free search function and online access to images of the pages of the BMD indexes. The website was founded in 1998. FreeBMD was registered as a UK charity in 2003, with the organisation changing its name to Free UK Genealogy in 2014 to reflect the broadening of its scope.

== History ==
FreeBMD was founded in 1998 by Ben Laurie, Graham Hart and Camilla Von Massenbach, with the intention of creating a searchable version of the General Register Office indexes of England and Wales. The three founders were joined in 1999 by Dave Mayall. The project became a registered charity in 2003.

In 2005, FreeBMD absorbed the formerly separate, but closely allied, projects FreeCEN and FreeREG, bringing all three projects under a single trustee body, while retaining autonomous day-to-day management. In 2014, the name was changed to Free UK Genealogy, to better reflect their aims. In 2016, Free UK Genealogy became a Charitable Incorporated Organisation (CIO).

As of November 2024, FreeBMD has transcribed over 295 million distinct records, which represents the overwhelming majority of births, marriages and deaths registered in England and Wales from 1837 to 1997.

In 2015 Pat Reynolds was appointed executive director, in succession to Darren Wright.

== Activities ==
FreeBMD is engaged in an ongoing project to transcribe the General Register Office (GRO) of England and Wales indexes of Births, Marriages and Deaths. In 1999 they secured an agreement with the GRO to publish records that were more than 100 years old and initially concentrated on transcribing the marriage indexes, with births and deaths to a lesser degree. However, in 2003 the GRO agreed an open policy to transcribe all of the data and, since that time FreeBMD has transcribed births, marriages and deaths for later years. FreeBMD uses volunteer transcribers. By 2018 over 12000 volunteers had helped the project, transcribing from microfiches of the original register pages and also submitting individual entries. Most transcriptions for FreeBMD are created using specially-written safe software WinBMD and BMDVerify available from the FreeBMD website.

== Membership ==
Records are available to all without the need to register as a member. A free membership is required in order to transcribe data. At the end of 2023, the project had 495 volunteer members working on transcriptions, representing a loss of 54 volunteers since the start of the year, and continuing a trend of dwindling volunteer numbers over the previous years.

== Awards and reputation ==
In 2007, FreeBMD was awarded the Prince Michael of Kent Award by the Society of Genealogists. The same year, The Guardian selected FreeBMD as one of the 50 best "family history" websites.
