= Open Genealogy Alliance =

Project researching effects of copyright of genealogical data

- Website type: Family history
- Available in: English
- Owner: Open Rights Group
- Website: www.opengenalliance.org
- Commercial: No
- Current status: Active

The Open Genealogy Alliance (OGA) is a UK-based project launched by three partners: the Open Rights Group, Open Knowledge Foundation and FreeBMD. OGA is currently researching the genealogy sector and the copyright status of digitized public domain documents. The project was announced on 2 March 2011 by the Open Rights Group.

== See also ==
- Digitization of books
- Digitizing
- Electronic Frontier Foundation
- Open Rights Group
- Public domain image resources
