= Becky Hogge =

British writer (born 1979)

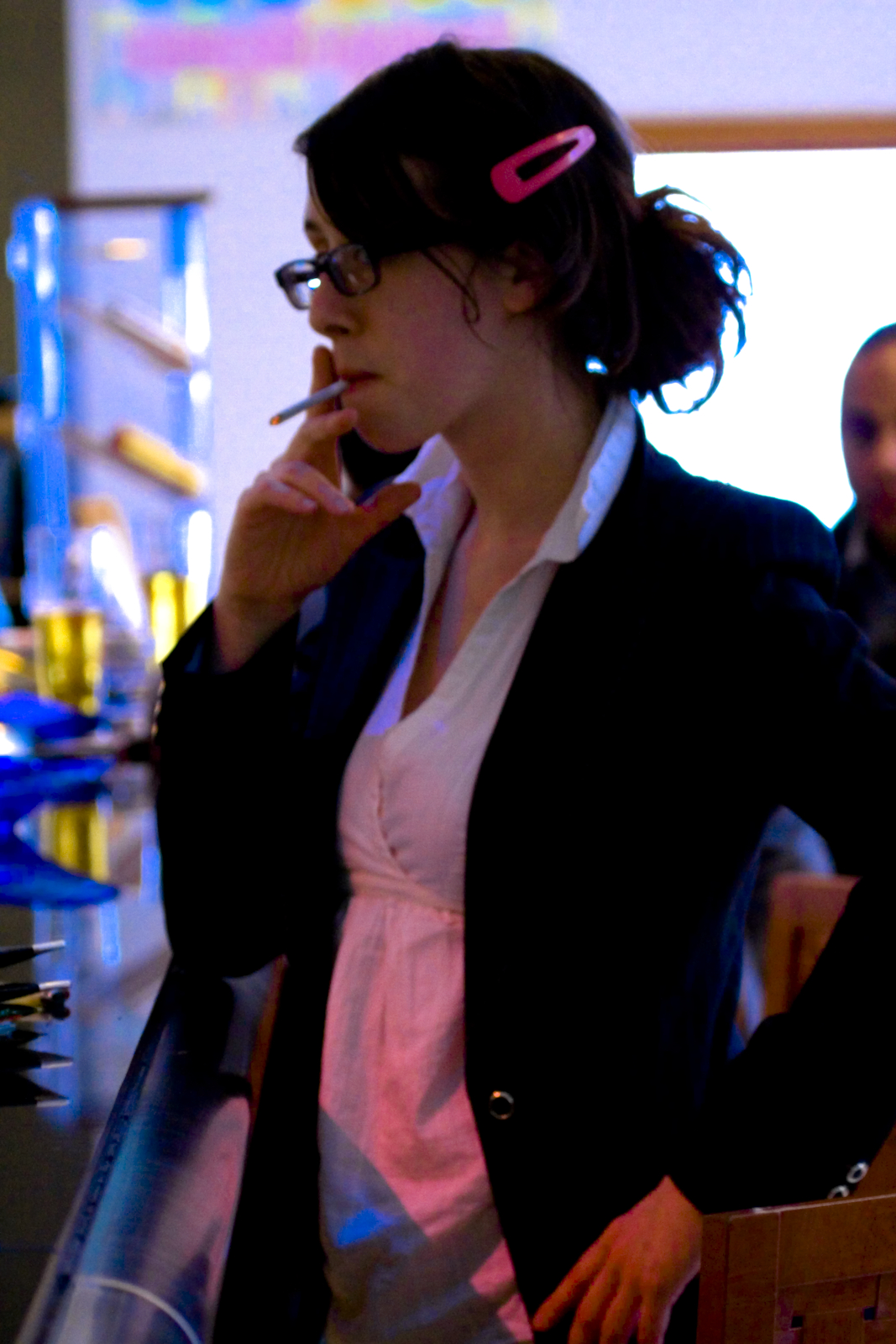
- Becky Hogge (March 2006)
- Born: 1979 (age 46–47); London, England
- Occupations: Writer on technology, politics and music; previously executive director of the Open Rights Group
- Website: barefootintocyberspace.com

Becky Hogge (born 1979 in London) is a UK-based music and technology writer and the first full-time executive director of the Open Rights Group, resigning in 2008. She was previously the managing editor, and then the technology director and technology commissioning editor for openDemocracy.net. During her time with openDemocracy she helped establish the China environment website chinadialogue.net, along with editor Isabel Hilton. She is a former board member of the Open Knowledge Foundation. and a member of its advisory board.

Becky Hogge talks about digital rights and the Open Rights Group

As a writer and commentator, she covers the global politics of technology, open source, and intellectual property rights. She writes a weekly technology column for the New Statesman and openDemocracy and has also written for The Guardian, and Prospect, In 2011 she published a book about the hacker culture entitled Barefoot into Cyberspace: Adventures in search of techno-Utopia.
