= Lindis Percy =

British peace activist

- Born: 1941 (age 84–85); Leeds, England
- Education: University of Bradford
- Occupations: Nurse, midwife and health visitor
- Employer: National Health Service
- Known for: Peace activism

Lindis Percy (born 1941, Leeds) is a peace activist in the United Kingdom and was a founding member and joint coordinator of the Campaign for the Accountability of American Bases. Reporting for The Guardian, journalist Rob Evans claimed that "there must surely be few Britons who have been arrested in political protests as many times as [Lindis Percy] has". She is a trained nurse, midwife and health visitor and worked for the National Health Service her entire working life.

== Methods ==
Percy attended the Department of Peace Studies, University of Bradford, in the late 1980s. As an activist she uses non-violent direct action and civil disobedience.

Additionally, Ms Percy also uses legal challenges, often assisted by solicitor Mark Stephens and barrister Keir Starmer QC and sometimes acts as a litigant in person to make her protests.

== Activism ==
Lindis Percy has been active since 1979, when cruise missiles were to be deployed at Greenham Common.

Legal cases arose from her actions in "uncovering and lawfully exercising ancient rights of way and the right to roam" across United States' NSA intelligence-gathering bases, such as Menwith Hill & Fylingdales located near her Yorkshire home and further afield at RAF Mildenhall and RAF Lakenheath which, as she claims, are actually USAF bases situated in the United Kingdom flagged to the RAF.

In June 1994 the newspapers reported that a series of meetings took place between representatives of the US and British governments "to discuss continuing incursions at US bases and how to deal with on-going US military concerns", as a result of Percy's persistent incursions into American and British bases and her campaigns in general.

The campaign against the Menwith Hill base was documented by Duncan Campbell in the Channel 4 documentary The Hill.

== Policy influence ==
In 2001 Percy submitted a memorandum to the House of Commons about an expansion of jurisdiction of the Ministry of Defence Police (MDP), which she opposed on several grounds, including what she denoted as an "extension of the jurisdiction of the MDP into areas not naturally within their stated role", thus essentially exposing "the citizen ... to a police force".

In 2002 Percy submitted an application for information held about her by the government under the Data Protection Act 1998. The MDP admitted that it held a "considerable amount of data" on Percy, but also that it was "so much" and so scattered around its filing cabinets that it would take "too much effort to dig it out". They suggested that she could identify specific incidents to narrow down their search for documents. She did so, but again the MDP refused to retrieve the information, arguing that the documents on her were exempted from release as they contained "sensitive information" to help in the "prevention and detection of crime".

In 2002 Percy spoke at Levellers Day. She was a speaker at the Global Network 2008 conference and the European Humanist Conference.

In 2008 Percy gave evidence to a Parliamentary inquiry into police tactics. She subsequently stated, "It is becoming increasingly difficult to get satisfaction through the formal processes of our democracy."

She rallied support for the hunger strike of Czech activist Jan Tamas who, along with Jan Bednář, was protesting against the Ground-Based Midcourse Defense facility at Brdy.

Percy was a supporter of and participant in the 2009 World March for Peace and Non-Violence.

== Personal life ==
Lindis Percy is a widow, with three adult children and six grandchildren. Her husband, Christopher, was a chaplain. They lived in Harrogate, Yorkshire, where her father once worked as a Church of England priest. She is a Quaker. Percy was cast in The Mythologist, a film about Habib "Henry" Azadehdel, also known as Dr Armen Victorian, a UFO conspiracy theorist.

== See also ==
- Anti-war movement
- Peace movement
- List of peace activists
