= Menwith Hill Elementary/High School =

Department of Defense school in North Yorkshire, England

Coordinates: 54°00′04″N 1°41′20″W

Menwith Hill Elementary/High School was an American facility located at RAF Menwith Hill in North Yorkshire, England. It closed in 2015.

== Academics ==
=== Teaching ===
Core classes were taught on site by DODDS certified teachers. There was a staff of about 30 teachers.

==== Elementary school ====
Elementary grades were taught by one core teacher with multiple "specials." These included art, PE, music and Host Nation cultural studies.

==== Middle and high school ====
Menwith followed the DODDS high school/middle school calendar of an eight-block, two-day schedule, with one seminar period. Sixth, seventh and eighth graders made up the middle school.

===== Gifted ed =====
Menwith Hill followed the DODDS Gifted Ed requirements.

== Activities ==
=== Sports ===
Menwith Hill was the home of the Mustangs. The teams played D-III football (boys), soccer (boys, girls), basketball (boys, girls), volleyball (girls), cross-country (boys, girls), track (boys, girls) and wrestling (boys, girls).

Due to the small school size, there was generally no need to qualify for any of the sports, as cutoffs would be meaningless and there was simply not a large enough applicant pool to allow cuts. In later years, higher demand led to cuts in both cheerleading, basketball, and girls' football (soccer). While this allowed for a large percentage of the student body to participate (an estimated 85% of students are involved in athletics), some teams were less successful than larger more-competitive schools.

=== NHS/NJHS ===
The National Junior Honor Society and National Honor Society were both available to middle or high school students. There were four students in NHS for the 2009 school year and twelve in NJHS.

=== Duke of Edinburgh Award ===
The Duke of Edinburgh Award was available at MHS. It required commitment in volunteering, physical fitness, skills and expeditions, with an added stipulation of residential work for those who competed for the top tier. Three tiers were available: bronze, silver and gold. Several middle and high school students pursued DofE awards.

=== Student government ===
There were three student governments at MHS: elementary, middle and high school. There had also been an overarching student council responsible for the well-being of the entire school. For the middle and high school, each class elected a president and vice president. The high school student government was responsible for fund-raising, planning for and coordinating dances, Spirit Week, prom, and the commencement ceremony, which was traditionally held at Fountains Abbey in Ripon.
