= Open Rights Group =

UK digital rights advocacy group

- Abbreviation: ORG
- Formation: 2005, UK
- Type: Non-profit organisation
- Purpose: Law, advocacy, digital rights
- Headquarters: London, England
- Location: United Kingdom
- Staff: 11
- Website: openrightsgroup.org

The Open Rights Group (ORG) is a UK-based organisation that works to preserve digital rights and freedoms by campaigning on digital rights issues and by fostering a community of grassroots activists. It campaigns on numerous issues including mass surveillance, internet filtering and censorship, and intellectual property rights.

== History ==
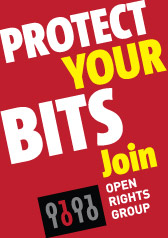
Open Rights Group poster

The organisation was started by Danny O'Brien, Cory Doctorow, Ian Brown, Rufus Pollock, James Cronin, Stefan Magdalinski, Louise Ferguson and Suw Charman after a panel discussion at Open Tech 2005. O'Brien created a pledge on PledgeBank, placed on 23 July 2005, with a deadline of 25 December 2005: "I will create a standing order of 5 pounds per month to support an organisation that will campaign for digital rights in the UK but only if 1,000 other people will too." The pledge reached 1000 people on 29 November 2005. The Open Rights Group was launched at a "sell-out" meeting in Soho, London.

== Work ==
The group has made submissions to the All Party Internet Group (APIG) inquiry into digital rights management and the Gowers Review of Intellectual Property.

The group was honoured in the 2008 Privacy International Big Brother Awards alongside No2ID, Liberty, Genewatch UK and others, as a recognition of their efforts to keep state and corporate mass surveillance at bay.

In 2010 the group worked with 38 Degrees to oppose the introduction of the Digital Economy Act, which was passed in April 2010.

In 2021 ORG won a case on the immigration exemption to data protection at the court of appeal with the3million. The court found that an exemption to data protection rules for immigration was unlawful under article 23 of UK GDPR.

The group opposed measures in the Online Safety Act 2023, that it sees as infringing free speech rights and online anonymity.] It later submitted evidence to a 2026 parliamentary inquiry into the act.

In 2024 ORG launched a digital rights manifesto to coincide with the UKs general election. The manifesto included six pledges including the right to send private messages; providing migrants with digital sanctuary; banning the use of pre-crime AI by the Police; defending the right to freedom of expression online; strengthening data protection rights and ending intrusive tracking by online advertises .

In June 2026 ORG helped to launch the Stop Killing the Internet] movement with support from NO2ID, Big Brother Watch, Defend Digital Me, Stop Killing Games and civil society partners around the world

The group campaigns against the Department for Digital, Culture, Media and Sport's plan to switch to an opt-out model for cookies. The group spokesperson stated that "[t]he UK government propose to make online spying the default option" in response to the proposed switch.

== Areas of interest ==
Cory Doctorow talks at ORGCon 2012 about the UK Government's Communications Data Bill 2012.

The organisation, though focused on the impact of digital technology on the liberty of UK citizens, operates with an apparently wide range of interests within that category. Its interests include:

=== Access to knowledge ===
- Copyright
  - Creative Commons
  - Free and open source software
  - The public domain
- Crown copyright
- Digital Restrictions Management
- Software patents

=== Free speech and censorship ===
- Internet filtering
- Right to parody
- s. 127 Communications Act 2003
- Online Safety Act

=== Government and democracy ===
- Electronic voting
- Freedom of information legislation

=== Privacy, surveillance and censorship ===
- Communications data retention
- Identity management
- Net Neutrality
- NHS patients' medical database
- Police DNA Records
- RFID

== Structure ==
ORG has a paid staff, whose members include:

- Jim Killock (executive director)

Former staff include Suw Charman-Anderson and Becky Hogge, both executive directors, e-voting coordinator Jason Kitcat, campaigner Peter Bradwell, grassroots campaigner Katie Sutton and administrator Katerina Maniadaki. Neil Gaiman was previously the group's patron. As of October 2022, the group had over 43,000 supporters.

== ORGCON ==
ORGCON was the first ever conference dedicated to digital rights in the UK, marketed as "a crash course in digital rights". It was held for the first time in 2010 at City University in London and included keynote talks from Cory Doctorow, politicians and similar pressure groups including Liberty, NO2ID and Big Brother Watch. ORGCON has since been held in 2012, 2013, 2014, 2017, and 2019 where the keynote was given by Edward Snowden.

== See also ==
- Campaign Against Censorship
- Censorship in the United Kingdom
- Internet censorship
- Open Genealogy Alliance
