= Ben Laurie =

Software engineer and cryptographer

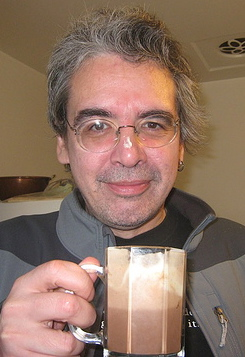
- Laurie in December 2007
- Occupation: Software engineer

Ben Laurie is an English software engineer. Laurie wrote Apache-SSL, the basis of most SSL-enabled versions of the Apache HTTP Server. He developed the MUD Gods, which was innovative in including online creation in its endgame.

Laurie also has written several articles, papers and books, and is interested in ideal knots and their applications.

Laurie was a member of WikiLeaks' Advisory Board. According to Laurie, he had little involvement with WikiLeaks, and didn't know who ran the site other than Julian Assange. In 2009, he also said he wouldn't trust WikiLeaks to protect him if he were a whistleblower because "the things that Wikileaks relies on are not sufficiently strong to defend against" a government's resources.

In 2024, Ben Laurie together with Al Cutter, Emilia Käsper and Adam Langley received the Levchin Prize ""for creating and deploying Certificate Transparency at scale".
