= RAF Menwith Hill =

Royal Air Force base in Yorkshire, England

RAF Menwith Hill
- Near Harrogate, North Yorkshire in England
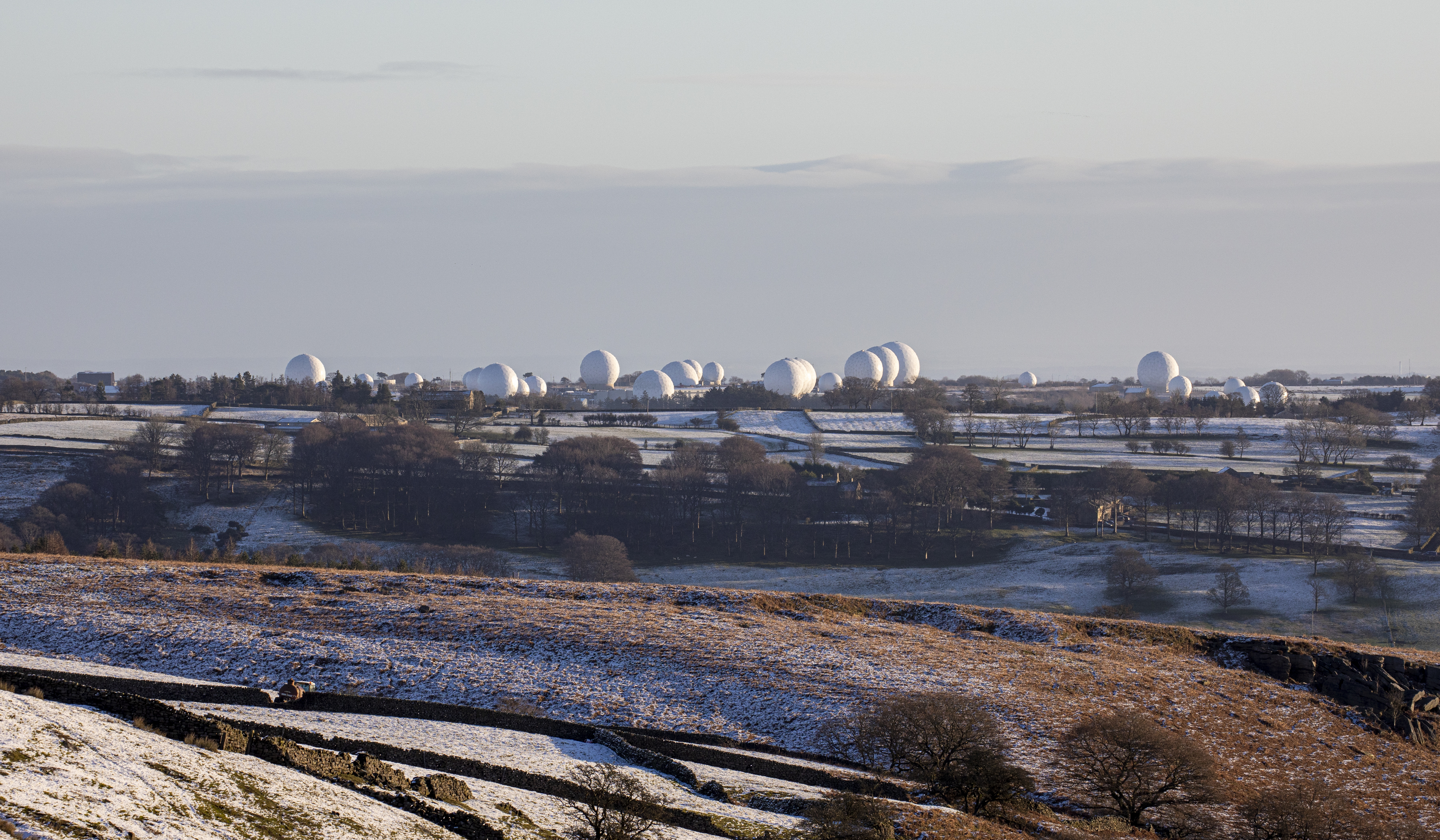
- Radomes at RAF Menwith Hill

Site information
- Type: Royal Air Force station (US Visiting Forces)
- Owner: Ministry of Defence
- Operator: Royal Air Force; United States Air Force; Government Communications Headquarters; National Security Agency
- Condition: Operational

Location
- Location in North Yorkshire
- Coordinates: 54°00′29″N 001°41′24″W
- Area: 605 acres (245 ha)

Site history
- Built: 1956 – 1959
- In use: 1959–present

Garrison information
- Garrison: 421st Air Base Squadron

Royal Air Force Menwith Hill (RAF Menwith Hill) is a Royal Air Force station near Harrogate, North Yorkshire, England, which provides communications and intelligence support services to the United Kingdom and the United States. The site contains an extensive satellite ground station and is a communications intercept and missile warning site. It has been described as the largest electronic monitoring station in the world.

RAF Menwith Hill is owned by the Ministry of Defence (MoD), but made available to the US Department of Defense (DoD) under the NATO Status of Forces Agreement 1951 and other, undisclosed agreements between the US and British governments. His Majesty's Government (HMG) is entitled to possession of the site and retains control over its use and its facilities, though the administration of the base is the responsibility of the US authorities, with support provided by around 400 staff from Government Communications Headquarters (GCHQ), in addition to United States Air Force (USAF) and US National Security Agency (NSA) personnel. In 2014, the number of American personnel was reduced as part of a streamlining of operations due to improvements in technology.

The site acts as a ground station for a number of satellites operated by the US National Reconnaissance Office, on behalf of the NSA, with antennas contained in numerous distinctive white radomes, locally referred to as "the golf balls", and is alleged to be an element of the ECHELON system.

The site is one of three main sites operated by the United States across the globe as a major satellite monitoring station and intelligence gathering location. The other two sites are located in America and Australia, having similar roles and working together with RAF Menwith Hill to develop knowledge around American, British and Australian interests. The Australian site is known as the Joint Defence Facility Pine Gap.

== History ==
=== Establishment of station (1954–1959) ===
In 1954, the British War Office purchased 246 acres (100 hectares) of land at Nessfield Farm, located approximately 7 kilometres (4.3 mi) west of Harrogate, North Yorkshire. The area purchased soon increased to 562 acres (227 hectares) and were made available by the British Government to the United States Department of Defense. The site was considered by the US as suitable for gathering signals intelligence from the northern parts of Western Europe and Eastern Europe, specifically the Soviet Union and its associated Warsaw Pact countries. The Yorkshire Dales' low level of background radio noise made it an especially good location for the task. The UK provided assurances to the US that the site would be available to them for at least 21 years.

Construction of the station on behalf of the United States Army Security Agency (USASA) began in April 1956. Building costs at the time were $6.8 million as well as a further $1.2 million for personnel housing. Initially named Field Station 8613, the site was renamed 13th USASA Field Station on 1 January 1957 and again renamed on 1 January 1959, as Menwith Hill Station. Due to adverse ground conditions and weather, there were delays to the construction programme, with the station finally becoming operational during June 1959.

=== Early years (1960–1966) ===
Operationally, Menwith Hill was assigned to the USASA Headquarters in Frankfurt, West Germany, whereas for logistical support it was attached to the US Air Force's Third Air Force, which at the time had its headquarters in the UK. Security at the station was provided by a US Army military police detachment and the British Air Ministry Constabulary. However, if the site was compromised during an invasion, three earth-covered bunkers contained ammunition and thermite charges which could be used to destroy classified equipment and material.

The station initially comprised a headquarters building, barracks, dependent housing and support facilities such as a cinema and social clubs. The operations building was located inside a secure compound, within a large antenna field, approximately 1.6 kilometres (0.99 mi) from the main site. It was equipped with large high frequency (HF) directional rhombic antennas that could detect signals from around the globe. Over two-hundred Collins R-390A HF communications receivers were used to collect a vast range of signal in the HF band, including carrier waves, voice signals, and burst transmissions. Within the operations centre was the communications centre which was staffed by cryptographers using deciphering equipment, however a large amount of the signals collected were encrypted before being forwarded for processing to the US National Security Agency's Fort Meade facility in Maryland.

=== Transfer to the National Security Agency (1966–1996) ===
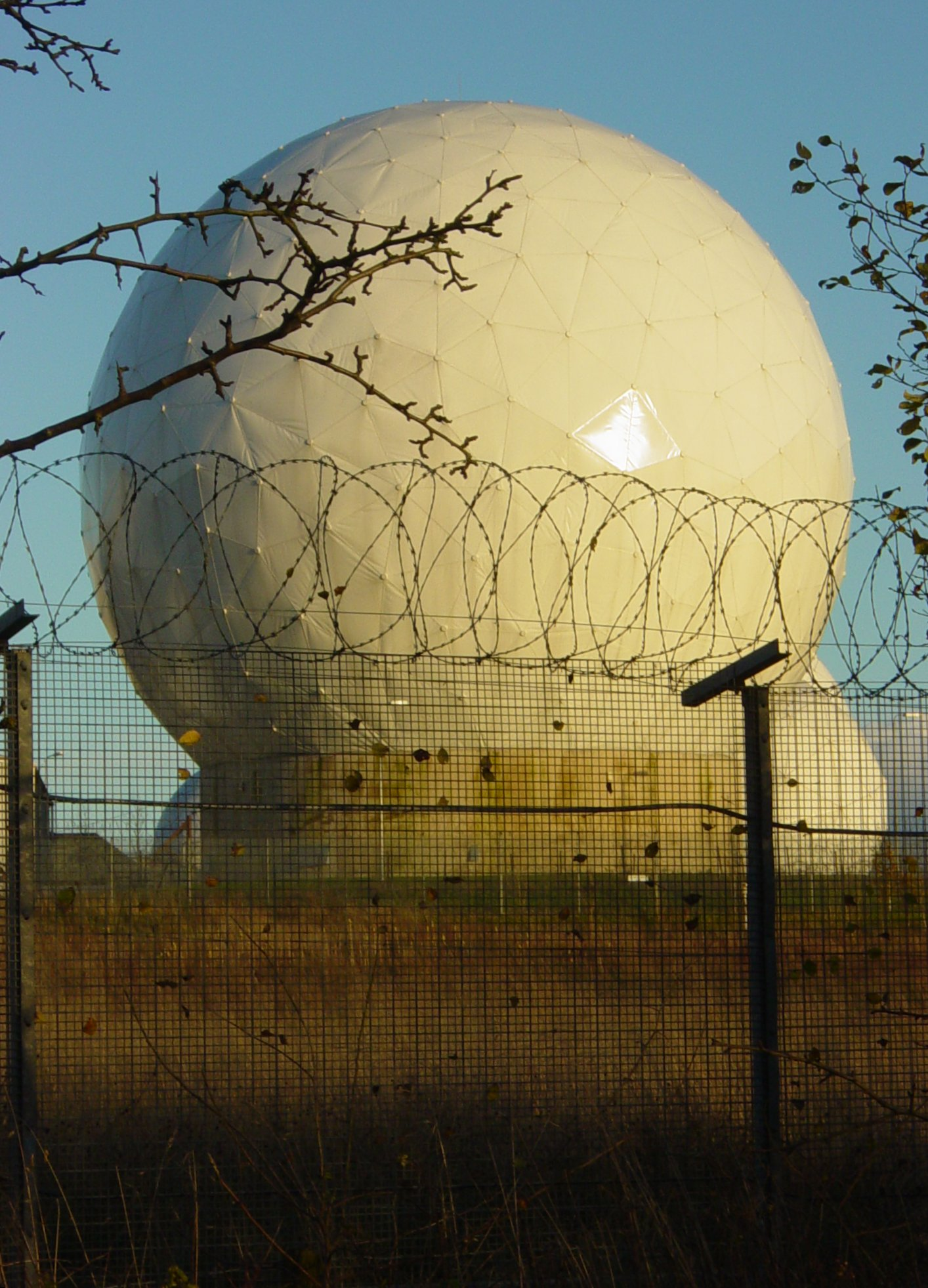
A Menwith Hill radome

In the 1960s, as a result of developments in digital technology and the increased use of satellites for signals intelligence, the specialist skills of engineers and technicians within the National Security Agency (NSA) and their contractors became increasingly important. Therefore, on 1 August 1966, with the agreement of the British Government, control of Menwith Hill Station was handed from the US Army to the NSA when it became a field element of the agency. The NSA expanded the station during the 1970s and 1980s, with the operations centre extended and new buildings erected. The first two radomes, designed to protect satellite receiver and transmission dishes (colloquially known as 'golf balls' and now synonymous with the station) were installed in 1974, at which point around 800 personnel were believed to work there.

In 1976, 21 years after the initial tenure arrangements were agreed with the US, the British Government renewed assurances that the site would continue to be available for a further 21 years.

Menwith Hill came to public attention in 1980 when British magazine the New Statesman published an article which suggested that the station was the world's largest phone tapping facility and highlighted the secrecy afforded to it by the British and US governments. Investigations found that during the early 1960s, Menwith Hill was integrated into the General Post Office's microwave relay network known as 'Backbone', via a high-capacity underground cable link to the Hunters Stones communications tower, located approximately 3 miles (4.8 km) to the south of the station. It was alleged the link allowed mass interception of civilian telephone and telex communications between the United States, UK and Europe.

At the time, eight radomes were now present at Menwith Hill, connecting it with other sites in the NSA's satellite communications network and alleged to allow the surveillance of communications in foreign countries. In response to the article the NSA said "We do radio relays - material comes in from a variety of places and is rerouted. It is a switching operation. We route it sometimes to the UK and sometimes to the US". The suggestion that national and international communications were monitored was denied.

A detachment of the US Army 704th Military Intelligence (MI) Brigade was established at Menwith Hill in 1985. In 1992, the detachment became A Company of the 743rd Military Intelligence Battalion, 704th MI Brigade.

The US Air Force's 6951st Electronic Security Squadron was formed at Menwith Hill on 1 May 1991. It was later re-designated as the 451st Intelligence Squadron on 1 October 1993.

In 1995, the US Army Intelligence and Security Command (INSCOM) became the executive agent for Menwith Hill on behalf of the National Security Agency. INSCOM transformed A Company, 743rd Military Intelligence Battalion into the 713th Military Intelligence Group. In 2000, the group added a second company and was re-designated as the 109th Military Intelligence Group.

=== RAF Menwith Hill (1996 to present) ===
On 19 February 1996, the station was renamed RAF Menwith Hill, an administrative change to align the base with other sites made available to the United States by the United Kingdom.

During a 1997 court case, British Telecom revealed that in 1975, its predecessor, the Post Office, installed two cables between Menwith Hill and a coaxial cable that connected to the microwave radio station at Hunters Stones, which was part of the long-distance telephone network. This connection was replaced in 1992 by a new high capacity fibre-optic cable. Later, two additional cables were added over which telephone and other communications could go to and from the base. These cables were capable of transmitting over 100,000 phone calls simultaneously.

On 1 October 2000, the 451st Intelligence Squadron was re-designated as the 451st Information Operations Squadron, before reverting to the 451st Intelligence Squadron on 1 April 2007.

On 19 July 2002, US Army INSCOM transferred responsibility for administrative and logistical support for Menwith Hill to the US Air Force, to bring the site in-line with other facilities in the UK made available to the US. Notwithstanding, the US Army retained a presence and in place of the 109th Military Intelligence Group, INSCOM formed a provisional battalion designated as the Menwith Hill Battalion (Provisional). On 18 October 2008 the unit, under the command of a lieutenant colonel, was re-designated as the 307th Military Intelligence Battalion, subordinate to the 66th Military Intelligence Brigade headquartered at Wiesbaden, Germany. On 16 October 2009, the battalion was re-designated as the 709th Military Intelligence Battalion.

According to an article in a 2003 issue of an internal NSA newsletter, "Menwith is a large site (several hundred NSA civilians)". In March 2012 researcher Steve Schofield of BASIC produced a 65-page report called "Lifting the Lid on Menwith Hill", funded by the Joseph Rowntree Charitable Trust and commissioned and published by the Yorkshire Campaign for Nuclear Disarmament (CND). Menwith Hill's primary mission is to provide "intelligence support for UK, US and allied interests". The base's multimillion-pound expansion, Project Phoenix, is "one of the largest and most sophisticated high technology programs carried out anywhere in the UK over the last 10 years". Of the 1,800 employees in 2012, 400 were British and 1,200 were American employees of the NSA.

During the 2009 G-20 London Summit NSA intercept specialists based at Menwith Hill attempted to target and decode the encrypted telephone calls of the Russian president Dmitry Medvedev.

The 451st Intelligence Squadron, was inactivated on 24 June 2015.

In November 2017, the site had 627 US staff and 578 UK staff.

== Facilities ==
Planning permission was granted in August 2019 for the construction of three new radomes at the site, bringing the total number to thirty-seven. The three new radomes would be 21 metres (69 ft) in diameter and located in the southern part of the site.

Extension of the site means that it now covers 605 acres (245 ha).

== Role and operations ==
=== Ownership and administration ===
RAF Menwith Hill is owned by the British Ministry of Defence (MOD). Although designated as an RAF station, it is made available to the United States Department of Defense (DOD) under the 1951 NATO Status of Forces Agreement and other classified arrangements. The MOD retains control over the site's use and facilities, however the administration of the site is the responsibility of the US authorities.

The US Air Force's 421st Air Base Squadron provides Menwith Hill with base and mission support services. The squadron is part of the 423rd Air Base Group which in turn is part of the 501st Combat Support Wing, both of which have their headquarters at RAF Alconbury in Cambridgeshire.

=== Mission ===
According to the Royal Air Force "RAF Menwith Hill is an integral part of the US DOD world-wide defence communications network. Its primary mission is to provide intelligence support for UK, US and allied interests." The site is a field station of the US National Security Agency (NSA), with personnel from other parts of the DOD also present. UK personnel from the MOD and Government Communications Headquarters (GCHQ) are integrated into both the operational and administrative elements of the site.

In November 2017, the British Government advised that 1,205 personnel worked at the station, comprising 33 staff from the US military, 344 US contractors, 250 US civilians, 7 UK military (5 Royal Navy and 2 RAF), 85 UK contractors and 486 UK civilians (including those employed by GCHQ).

== Security ==
Site security is provided by the Ministry of Defence Police (MDP). One of three MDP Central Support Group units is based at Menwith Hill, providing armed officers who can be deployed regionally at short notice, to support wider MDP operations.

On 1 April 2006, RAF Menwith Hill was designated as a protected site for the purposes of Section 128 of the Serious Organised Crime and Police Act 2005. The effect of the act was to make it a specific criminal offence for a person to trespass into the station.

== ECHELON Interception System ==
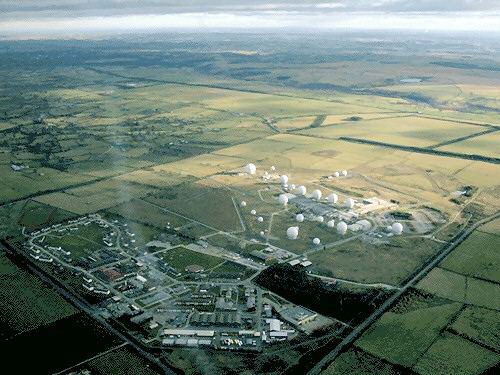
Aerial view of RAF Menwith Hill

In 1988, investigative journalist Duncan Campbell revealed, in an article entitled "Somebody's listening" and published in New Statesman, the existence of the ECHELON surveillance program, an extension of the UKUSA Agreement on global signals intelligence Sigint. He also detailed how the eavesdropping operations worked. Duncan Campbell presented a report commissioned by STOA concerning the ECHELON system, at a "hearing of the Committee on Citizens Freedoms and Rights, Justice and Home Affairs on the subject the European Union and data protection" which prompted the European Union to set up the Temporary Committee on the ECHELON Interception System.

On 5 July 2000, the European Union set up the European Parliament's Temporary Committee on the ECHELON Interception System stated that the global system for the interception of private and commercial communications was operating by means of "cooperation proportionate to their capabilities" among the US, the UK, Canada, Australia and New Zealand under the UKUSA. ... It seems likely ... that its name is in fact ECHELON." The Committee raised concerns about the incompatibility of the interception of private and commercial communications with the fundamental right to respect for private life (Article 8 of the ECHR). They were also concerned that interception of commercial communications could be used for "competitive intelligence-gathering rather than combating corruption." During the early 1970s, the first of what became more than eight large satellite communications dishes were installed at Menwith Hill.

In 1999 Campbell wrote a report on COMINT entitled Interception Capabilities 2000 for the European Parliament.

In 1996 author and investigative journalist, Nicky Hager in his book entitled Secret Power: New Zealand's Role in the International Spy Network, provided a detailed account of ECHELON, the worldwide electronic surveillance system used by an intelligence alliance of the United States, the United Kingdom, Canada, Australia and New Zealand.

On 3 November 1999, the BBC reported that they had confirmation from the Australian Government of the existence of a powerful "global spying network" codenamed Echelon, that can eavesdrop on every single phone call, fax or e-mail, anywhere on the planet" with Britain and the United States as the chief protagonists. They confirmed that Menwith Hill was "linked directly to the headquarters of the US National Security Agency (NSA) at Fort Meade in Maryland."

== Demonstrations ==
Between 1984 and 1995 a number of peace camps were established in close proximity to the station. A number of other individual protests have also taken place, predominantly related to nuclear proliferation and strategic missile defense. Protests also occurred at other US military locations in the UK such as Greenham Common.

Objections to the Strategic Defense Initiative have led to demonstrators storming the perimeter fence, and to demands in 2007 from Labour MPs for a full debate about missile defence and Menwith Hill. Actions continue into 2006.

One particular local activist, Lindis Percy, was prosecuted, over a protracted period, under a number of different laws.

In April 2012 activists affiliated with the global Occupy Movement held a four-day campsite at Menwith Hill. Protesters said they hoped the camp would "reignite the debate locally, nationally and globally about whether the subversive and undemocratic nature of activities at the base are acceptable, or indeed accountable, to the British public". This debate however, never happened outside of the fringe elements of society.

== See also ==
- List of Royal Air Force stations
- Listening station
- Menwith Hill Elementary/High School
- RAF Croughton, another large US military communications and intelligence site
- United States Air Forces in Europe
- United States Air Force in the United Kingdom
