= Blue Valley West High School =

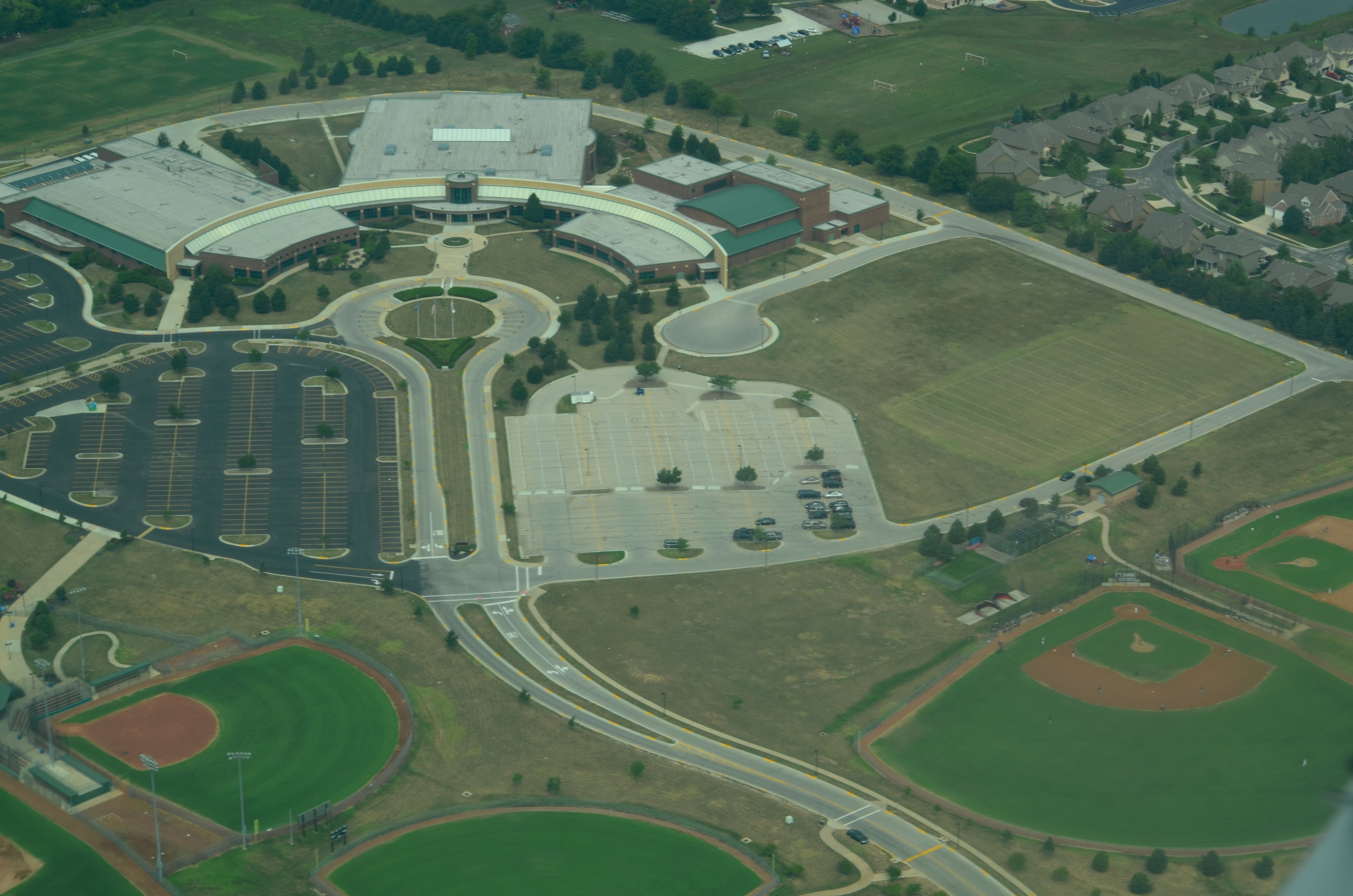
- Aerial view of Blue Valley West High School

Location
- 16200 Antioch Road; Overland Park, Kansas 66085; United States; 38.835155°N 94.692624°W

Information
- School type: Public, High School
- Motto: Cultivating lifelong learners prepared to navigate their future with purpose.
- Established: August 2001
- School district: Blue Valley USD 229
- CEEB code: 172821
- Principal: Katie Bonnema
- Staff: 126
- Teaching staff: 103.93 (on an FTE basis)
- Grades: 9 to 12
- Gender: Coeducational
- Enrollment: 1,558 (2023–2024)
- Student to teacher ratio: 14.76
- Colors: Red, Black, and Silver
- Athletics conference: Eastern Kansas League
- Nickname: Jaguars
- Team name: The Jaguars
- Newspaper: The Spotlight
- Yearbook: The Illumination
- Feeder schools: Lakewood Middle School; Pleasant Ridge Middle School
- Website: https://bvw.bluevalleyk12.org/

Blue Valley West High School is a fully accredited public high school located in Overland Park, Kansas, United States. It is one of five high schools by Blue Valley USD 229 school district, and has a current enrollment of approximately 1,280 students. The current principal is Katie Bonnema. The school mascot is the Jaguar and the school colors are red, black, and silver.

Blue Valley West High School opened in August 2001 in order to help educate the increasing population of Overland Park. It was the fourth high school in the Blue Valley Unified School District to open, preceded by Blue Valley Northwest High School in 1993. Blue Valley West is a member of the Kansas State High School Activities Association and offers a variety of sports programs. Athletic teams compete in the 6A division and are known as the "Jaguars". Extracurricular activities are also offered in the form of performing arts, school publications, and clubs.

== History ==
Blue Valley West High School opened in August 2001 in order to help educate the increasing population of Overland Park. It was the fourth high school in the Blue Valley Unified School District to open, preceded by Blue Valley Northwest High School in 1993, and followed by Blue Valley Southwest High School in 2010.

== Academics ==
The school offers 17 Advanced Placement classes, foreign language in Spanish, French, and Chinese, and performing and visual arts classes, among others. The journalism department produces The Spotlight (newspaper) and The Illumination (yearbook). Its broadcasting class produces Jagged Edge TV. The class of 2013 achieved an average score of 1828 on the SAT and 25 on the ACT.

== Extracurricular activities ==
The Jaguars compete in the Eastern Kansas League and are classified as a 6A-5A school according to the KSHSAA. Throughout its history, Blue Valley West has won several state championships in various sports. Many graduates have gone on to participate in collegiate athletics. In the 2006–2007 school year the school won 2 state championships, was runner up for another, and had 4 other teams qualify for the state tournament. In the 2007 calendar year, BV West won the state title in football, boys' basketball, and baseball. This three-peat was the first of its kind in the history of KSHSAA competition.

=== State championships ===
State Championships
Season	Sport/activity	Number of championships	Year
Fall	Football	1	2007
Fall	Volleyball, girls'	4	2005, 2015, 2020, 2025
Fall	Debate, four-speaker	1	2011
Fall	Debate, two-speaker	2	2012, 2013
Fall	Soccer, girls'	9	2002, 2005, 2009, 2010, 2017, 2018, 2019, 2021, 2022
Winter	Swimming and diving, boys'	3	2019, 2020, 2021
Winter	Swimming and diving, girls'	1	2021
Spring	Baseball	4	2007, 2013, 2022, 2023
Spring	Soccer, boys'	3	2004, 2010, 2017
Spring	Golf, boys'	3	2002, 2006, 2013
Spring	Golf, girls'	1	2021
Spring	Tennis, boys'	6	2015, 2017, 2018, 2023, 2024, 2025
Winter	Basketball, boys'	1	2007
Total		40	

=== Athletics ===
==== Football ====
The Blue Valley West Jaguar football team has become a contender in Kansas 6A football. The team's main rivals are Blue Valley High School and Saint Thomas Aquinas High School. Blue Valley West and Blue Valley have also developed a rivalry. Blue Valley West won the 2007 Eastern Kansas League title and went on to win the Kansas 5A State Championship on November 24, 2007, with an undefeated 13–0 season.

==== Boys Baseball ====
The boys baseball team won the Eastern Kansas League (EKL) title every year from the school's opening in 2001 to 2006, and did not lose a single game in conference until 2006. The baseball team won state championships in 2007, 2022, and 2023.

== Performing arts ==
The school has a theater group that presents three shows a year as part of the school curriculum. Choir programs offered include concert choir, choraliers, chorale and chamber, the last three of which require an audition. Orchestra programs are also available, with the school offering a concert orchestra and a symphonic orchestra.

=== Band ===
Blue Valley West has a competitive marching band, a concert band, a symphonic band, and a symphonic wind ensemble. The competitive marching band won the Kansas Bandmasters Association Marching Band Championship and also placed top 25 in the Bands of America St. Louis Super Regional Championship in the 2017–18 and 2018-19 school years.

== Notable alumni ==
- Matt Besler (Class of 2005) — MLS player for Sporting Kansas City
- Johnny Dee (Class of 2011) — basketball player who plays professionally in Spain
- Connor Embree (Class of 2010) — former NFL wide receivers coach for the Kansas City Chiefs
- Andrew Gachkar (Class of 2007) — former NFL player for several teams
- Madison Lilley (Class of 2017) — professional volleyball player and member of U.S. national team
- Shannon Vreeland (Class of 2010) — gold medalist in the 200 Freestyle Relay at 2012 Summer Olympics
- Andrew Wojtanik (Class of 2008) — winner of the 2004 National Geographic Bee

== See also ==
- List of high schools in Kansas
- List of unified school districts in Kansas

Other high schools in Blue Valley USD 229 school district

- Blue Valley High School in Stilwell
- Blue Valley North High School in Overland Park
- Blue Valley Northwest High School in Overland Park
- Blue Valley Southwest High School in Overland Park
- Blue Valley Academy in Overland Park
