= Blue Valley North High School =

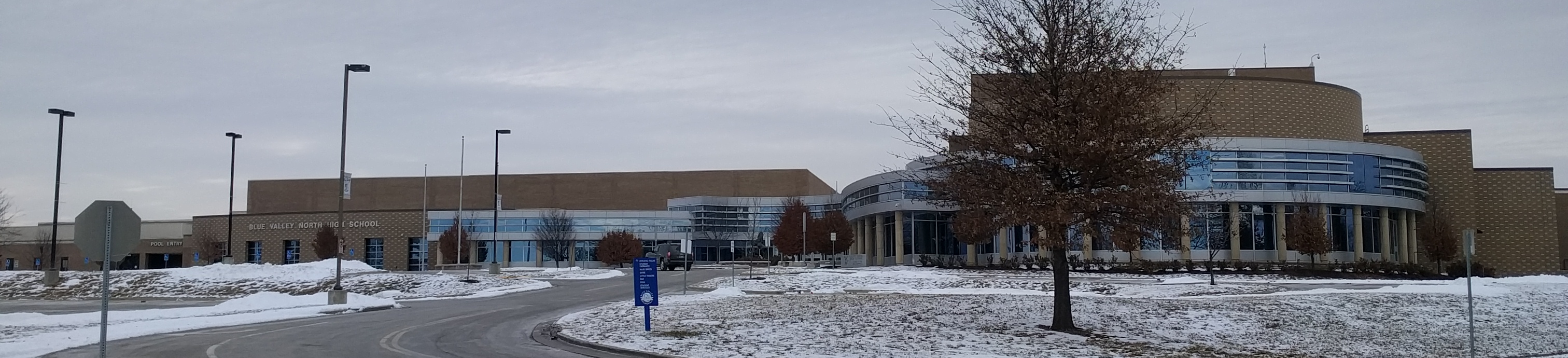

Location
- 12200 Lamar Avenue; Overland Park, Kansas 66209; United States; 38°54′24.1″N 94°39′37.6″W

Information
- School type: Public, High School
- Established: 1986
- School district: Blue Valley USD 229
- CEEB code: 172294
- Principal: Brad Page
- Teaching staff: 96.00 (on an FTE basis)
- Grades: 9–12
- Gender: coed
- Enrollment: 1,302 (2023-2024)
- Student to teacher ratio: 14.21
- Campus type: Suburban
- Colors: Navy; Silver; White
- Athletics: Class 6A; District 2
- Athletics conference: Eastern Kansas
- Nickname: Mustangs
- Rival: Blue Valley Northwest High School
- Accreditation: Blue Ribbon 1990 and 2008.
- National ranking: 836
- Newspaper: The North Star
- Yearbook: Northern Light
- Communities served: Overland Park & Leawood
- Website: School Website

Blue Valley North High School is a public high school located in Overland Park, Kansas, United States, serving students in grades 9–12. The school is one of the five high schools operated by Blue Valley USD 229 school district. The school colors are navy blue and silver. The current enrollment is approximately 1,550 students. The principal is Brad Page.

Blue Valley North is a member of the Kansas State High School Activities Association and offers a variety of sports programs. Athletic teams compete in the 6A Division and are known as the "Mustangs". Extracurricular activities are also offered in the form of performing arts, school publications, and clubs.

== History ==
Former logo of the school.

In 1986, Blue Valley North was the second high school built by the Blue Valley school district.

== Academics ==
Blue Valley North was awarded the Blue Ribbon Award in the 1990–1991 academic year, one of the most successful years for the school. Blue Valley North won the award again in the 2007–2008 academic year. The Blue Ribbon Award recognizes public and private schools which perform at high levels or have made significant academic improvements.

== Extracurricular activities ==
=== Athletics ===
The Mustangs compete in the Eastern Kansas League (EKL) and are classified as a 6A school, the largest classification in Kansas according to the Kansas State High School Activities Association. Throughout its history, Blue Valley North has won several state championships in various sports. Many graduates have gone on to participate in collegiate athletics. The Blue Valley North Mustangs are considered rivals with the Blue Valley Northwest Huskies. The two schools, share the District Athletic Complex located on the corner of 135th and Switzer as a home stadium for football, soccer, and baseball games. The Mustangs also compete against the rest of the Blue Valley High Schools, the nearby Shawnee Mission School District, and the Olathe School District.

=== State championships ===
State Championships
Season	Sport	Number of Championships	Year
Fall	Soccer, Boys	4	1992, 2000, 2001, 2007
Fall	Golf, Girls	4	1988, 2009, 2010, 2011
Fall	Football	1	2017
Fall	Volleyball, Girls	1	2021
Fall	Cross Country, Girls	1	2002
Fall	Gymnastics, Girls	1	1997
Fall	Cheer (Gameday)	1	2018
Winter	Swimming and Diving, Boys	12	1991†, 1992, 1998, 1999, 2000, 2001, 2002, 2011, 2014, 2023, 2024, 2025
Winter	Swimming and Diving, Girls	5	1999, 2005, 2006, 2011, 2025
Winter	Basketball, Boys	2	1997, 2021
Winter	Basketball, Girls	5	1998, 2000, 2005, 2023, 2025
Spring	Golf, Boys	4	1992, 1993, 2012, 2017
Spring	Soccer, Girls	2	1998, 2007
Spring	Track & Field, Boys	2	1993, 1999
Spring	Tennis, Boys	8	1993, 1994, 1995, 1996, 1997, 2009, 2010, 2011
Spring	Tennis, Girls	17	1996, 1997, 1998, 1999, 2002, 2004, 2005, 2006, 2007, 2009, 2010, 2015, 2016, 2017, 2018, 2019
Spring	Softball	1	1993
Spring	Baseball	2	1997, 2012
Year-Round	Scholars Bowl	2	2022, 2023
Year-Round	Speech & Drama	4	1997, 2009, 2013, 2016
Year-Round	Debate	8	2002, 2003, 2004, 2005, 2020, 2024, 2025, 2026
Total		86	

† 1991 co-champion

=== Performing arts ===
==== Vocal music ====
Blue Valley North has five choirs: Concert Choir, Women's Chorale, Chorale, and Chamber Singers.

==== Forensics ====
The forensics team at North has won some outstanding titles. In Spring 2009, the BVN Forensics team won first place in the state out of 28 other 6A schools. In the National qualifying tournaments, nearly every first and second place slot went to Blue Valley North. Also, in Spring 2010, the BVN Forensics team won first place in state for 6A schools. In 2015, the forensics team was ranked first in Kansas and sixth in the nation.

=== Robotics ===
In 2008, FIRST Robotics Team 2410, the Metal Mustangs Robotics Team was formed. That season, they competed at two regionals, the Greater Kansas City regional and winning the Rookie All-Star award from St. Louis, which granted the team attendance to the FIRST World Championships that year. In their 2010 season, they again took home multiple awards, being finalists at the Greater Kansas City regional and then becoming the number one seeded robot at the Oklahoma Regional and winning the competition. They then competed at the 2010 World Championships, and finished in the upper half of their division. In the fall of 2010, the team moved to the Center For Advanced Professional Studies facility.

== Notable alumni ==
- Andrew Babaloa, football player
- Casey Crawford, former professional basketball player
- Jeffrey Fisher, U.S. Supreme Court litigator
- Andy Gruenebaum, former professional goalkeeper for Sporting Kansas City of Major League Soccer
- Harry Higgs, professional golfer
- Jon Kempin, professional goalkeeper for LA Galaxy of Major League Soccer
- Dasan McCullough, college football linebacker for the Oklahoma Sooners of the Big 12 Conference (Transferred to Bloomington High School South)
- Graham Mertz, NFL backup football quarterback for the Houston Texans.
- Nikolai Mushegian, software architect
- Frances Silva, former professional midfielder for FC Kansas City of the National Women's Soccer League
- Eric Sock, professional tennis player
- Jack Sock, professional tennis player, winner of a gold and bronze medal in the 2016 Summer Olympics

== See also ==
- List of high schools in Kansas
- List of unified school districts in Kansas

Other high schools in Blue Valley USD 229 school district

- Blue Valley High School in Stilwell
- Blue Valley Northwest High School in Overland Park
- Blue Valley West High School in Overland Park
- Blue Valley Southwest High School in Overland Park
- Blue Valley Academy in Overland Park
