= Mason Richman =

American football player (born 2002)

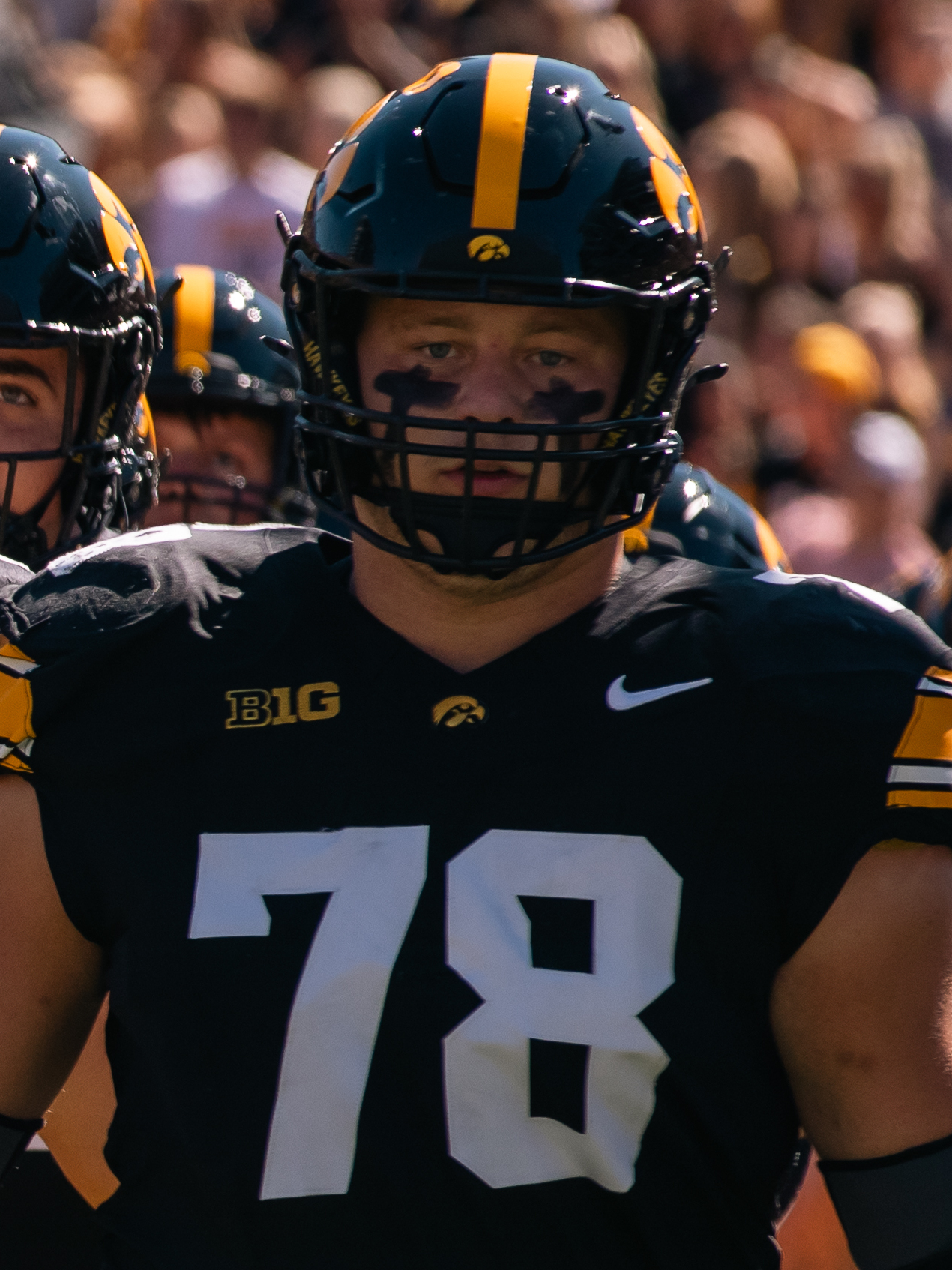
- Richman with Iowa in 2024

No. 78 – Seattle Seahawks
- Position: Offensive tackle
- Roster status: Injured reserve

Personal information
- Born: May 7, 2002 (age 24); Leawood, Kansas, U.S.
- Listed height: 6 ft 5 in (1.96 m)
- Listed weight: 307 lb (139 kg)

Career information
- High school: Blue Valley (Overland Park, Kansas)
- College: Iowa (2020–2024)
- NFL draft: 2025: 7th round, 234th overall pick

Career history
- Seattle Seahawks (2025–present)

Awards and highlights
- Super Bowl champion (LX)

Career NFL statistics as of 2025
- Games played: 2
- Games started: 0
- Stats at Pro Football Reference

Mason Richman (born May 7, 2002) is an American professional football offensive tackle for the Seattle Seahawks of the National Football League (NFL). He played college football for the Iowa Hawkeyes and was selected by the Seahawks in the seventh round of the 2025 NFL draft.

== Early life ==
Richman was born on May 7, 2002, and grew up in Leawood, Kansas the son of Kathy Richman Wallace and John Richman. He attended Blue Valley High School, where he made the varsity team in football as a sophomore. At Blue Valley, he played as a tight end and defensive end and was named all-state as a senior. A three-star prospect, he committed to play college football for the Iowa Hawkeyes as an offensive tackle.

== College career ==
Richman redshirted during the 2020 season, appearing in three games. He became a starter in 2021. He ended up being a starter for four years, which included a streak of 43 consecutive starts for the Hawkeyes from his freshman season to his senior season. Playing at left tackle, he started 12 games in 2021, 13 games in 2022, 14 games in 2023, and 13 games in 2024. He was an honorable mention All-Big Ten Conference selection in all four years as a starter. He concluded his collegiate career with 52 starts, the most among linemen in the coach Kirk Ferentz era, and as a senior in 2024, he contributed to an Iowa rushing attack that was among the top 25 nationally in rushing yards per game. He was also an Academic All-Big Ten selection, and the 2024 Hawkeye offensive line was a semifinalist for the Joe Moore Award for best offensive line.

== Professional career ==
Pre-draft measurables
| Height | Weight | Arm length | Hand span | Wingspan | 40-yard dash | 10-yard split | 20-yard split | 20-yard shuttle | Three-cone drill | Vertical jump | Broad jump | Bench press |
|---|---|---|---|---|---|---|---|---|---|---|---|---|
| 6 ft 5 3/8 in (1.97 m) | 307 lb (139 kg) | 32 1/8 in (0.82 m) | 9 7/8 in (0.25 m) | 6 ft 6 in (1.98 m) | 5.34 s | 1.89 s | 3.02 s | 4.63 s | 7.47 s | 28.0 in (0.71 m) | 9 ft 2 in (2.79 m) | 21 reps |
All values from Pro Day

Richman was selected by the Seattle Seahawks in the seventh round (234th overall) of the 2025 NFL draft. As a rookie, he appeared in two games in the 2025 season.

On August 25, 2026, Richman was placed on season–ending injured reserve due to a right leg injury.
