= 16th National Geographic Bee =

2000 American academic competition

- Date: May 26, 2004
- Location: Washington, D.C.
- Winner: Andrew Wojtanik (14 at time of win)
- No. of contestants: 55

The 16th National Geographic Bee was held in Washington, D.C., on May 26, 2004, sponsored by the National Geographic Society and ING. The final competition was moderated by Jeopardy! host Alex Trebek. The winner was Andrew Wojtanik of Kansas, who won a $25,000 college scholarship, lifetime membership in the National Geographic Society, and a trip to a Busch Gardens/Sea World Adventure Camp. The 2nd-place winner, Matthew Wells of Montana, won a $15,000 scholarship. The 3rd-place winner, Eric Liaw of Hawaii, won a $10,000 scholarship.

== 2004 State Champions ==
State	Name	School	City/Town	Grade	Place	Notes
District of Columbia	Thomas Meyerson	8th	Won the District of Columbia Bee in 2003			
Hawaii	Eric Liaw	Punahou Junior High School	Honolulu	6th	Third Place	Won the Hawaii State Bee in 2003
Illinois	Yangbo Du	Dunlap	8th	Top 10 finalist (4th place)		
Iowa	Mattias Gassman	Ames	8th	Top 10 finalist (5th place)		
Kansas	Andrew Wojtanik	Lakewood Middle School	Overland Park	8th	2004 Champion	Won the Kansas State Bee in 2003
Louisiana	Thimal de Alwis	Hammond	Top 10 finalist (6th place)			
Massachusetts	Krishnan Chandra	6th				
Michigan	Jamie Ding	7th	East Middle School	Canton		
Minnesota	Nathan Cornelius	Cottonwood	6th	Won the Minnesota State Bee in 2003		
Montana	Matthew Wells	Headwaters Academy	Bozeman	8th	Second Place	
New Hampshire	Matt Savage	Francestown	6th			
Ohio	Gautham Senthilkumar	Bowling Green	8th	Top 10 finalist (7th place)		
Oklahoma	Christopher Chesny	Claremore	8th	Top 10 finalist (8th place)	Won the Oklahoma State Bee in 2003	
Pennsylvania	Olivia Colangelo	8th				
Utah	Derek Wells	Pinnacle Canyon Academy	Wellington	7th	Won the Utah State Bee in 2002	
Virginia	Naren Tallapragada	Nysmith School	Herndon	7th		
Washington	Cory Sweers	Auburn	Top 10 finalist (9th place)			
Wisconsin	Bo Sun	Ladysmith	8th	Top 10 finalist (10th place)		
