= National Geographic World Championship =

Biennial, two-day-long international geography competition

The National Geographic World Championship (previously called the International Geography Olympiad, which is now the title of another similar competition for older schoolchildren) is a biennial, two-day-long international geography competition typically held in late July or early August. The Championship was first held in 1993, and is sponsored by the National Geographic Society. Teams of three students plus one alternate are selected from among those who finished highest in their respective countries' national competitions (e.g. the National Geographic Bee in the US, the Olimpíada Geográfica Argentina in Argentina or the Australian Geography Competition in Australia). On the first day of competition, these teams take a written test on which all members confer and work together, then take part in a team geography skills-testing activity, such as using a map to find specified locations in unfamiliar surroundings. The scores from these two events are tallied, and the top three teams advance to the final round on the second day. The final round consists of questions primarily in the style of the National Geographic Bee, as a moderator (since 1993, Alex Trebek) reads questions to one team or one individual at a time. These questions may also involve the use of visual aids such as maps or photographs. Members of the top three teams receive bronze, silver, or gold medals for finishing third, second, or first, respectively.

The National Geographic World Championship was initiated by the National Geographic Society in 1993. To be able to participate in the biennial competition (held every other year), a National Geographic approved organization in a country (the “Country Sponsor”), working with the Ministry of Education in the country, must run its own annual nationwide geography competition which is open to most students under 16 years of age, based on school level, regional and/or national competitions. In the US it is called “The National Geographic Bee”. Other nations have different names for their competitions. Student team members must be 16 years of age or younger and not out of secondary school, at the time of the international competition. Each Country Sponsor is responsible for managing its own national competition, including compliance with all applicable laws and regulations. National Geographic has hosted nine international competitions to date. The medals are for recognition purposes and have no significant monetary value.

== Rules and regulations ==
Each Country Sponsor can send a team of three (3) students and one adult escort to the National Geographic World Championship. As the event has grown, they must be firm with this number and cannot permit other students or adults to attend the activities associated with the event, other than the final part of the competition on the last day. The adult escort must be fluent in English, be knowledgeable on the subject of geography, and be associated with the national competition in their country. A student may not participate in more than one international competition. Students must be no older than 16 years of age at the time of the international competition.

== Locations and winners ==
1993

Location: London, England, UK

- First place: United States (Captain Noel Erinjeri, Michigan; Michael Ring, Rhode Island; Jeffrey Hoppes, Pennsylvania)
- Second place: United Kingdom (Captain Colm Walsh; Richard Webb; David Hunt)
- Third place: Russia (Captain Roman Amburtsev; Valerij Perelygin; Roman Fomin)

1995

Location: Orlando, Florida, US

- First place: Australia (Michael Lyon, Victoria; Patrick Chan, New South Wales; Michael Molinari, Western Australia)
- Second place: United Kingdom
- Third place: Canada

1997

Location: Washington, D.C., US

Dates: August 5–6

- First place: Canada (Durgesh Saraph, Ontario; Rohan Verghese, Ontario; Armand Gaudry, British Columbia; Pierre-Marc Lanteigne, Quebec)
- Second place: Argentina
- Third place: Russia

1999

Location: Toronto, Ontario, Canada

Dates: August 10–11

- First place: United States (David Beihl, Saluda, South Carolina; Jason Borschow, San Juan, Puerto Rico; John Kizer, Portsmouth, Ohio; Evan Sparks, Germantown, Tennessee)
- Second place: Canada
- Third place: Russia

2001

Location: Vancouver, British Columbia, Canada

Dates: August 1–2

- First place: United States (Kyle Haddad-Fonda, Bellevue, Washington; Nicholas Jachowski, Pukalani, Hawaii; Steven Young, Reston, Virginia; Joe Henry Legan, Haughton, Louisiana)
- Second place: Canada
- Third place: Hungary

2003

Location: Tampa, Florida, US

Dates: July 15–16

- First place: United States (Captain John Rice, Maddock, North Dakota; Dallas Simons, Nashville, Tennessee; Alexander Smith, Burlington, North Carolina)
- Second place: Germany (Captain Julian Nitzsche, Bautzen, Saxony; Sebastian Norck, Sonneberg, Thuringia; Sebastian Wildgrube, Meuro, Saxony-Anhalt)
- Third place: France (Captain Vincent Lafon, Paris; Antony Lee, Les Ulis; Thibaut Decazes, Versailles)

2005

Location: Budapest, Hungary

Dates: July 11–14

- First place: United States (Captain Andrew Wojtanik, Overland Park, Kansas; Jesse Weinberg, Coral Gables, Florida; Karan Takhar, North Attleboro, Massachusetts)
- Second place: Russia (Captain Ivan Prokhorov, Murmansk; Vera Efremova, Sterlitamak; Renat Temirgaleev, Orenburg)
- Third place: Canada (Captain Daniel Siracusa, Burnaby, BC; Nathan Friedman, Kamloops, BC; John Yao, Toronto, Ontario).

2007

Location: San Diego, California, US

Dates: August 5–10

- First place: Mexico (Captain Angel Aliseda Alonso, Guadalajara; Carlos Franco Ruiz, Zapotlan de Juarez; Emanuel Johansen Campos, Tejalpa)
- Second place: United States (Captain Matthew Vengalil, Grosse Pointe Shores, Michigan; Neeraj Sirdeshmukh, Nashua, New Hampshire; Kelsey Schilperoort, Prescott, Arizona)
- Third place: Canada (Captain Jonathan Whyte, Toronto, Ontario; Marky Freeman, Thornhill, Ontario; Maxim Ralchenko, Ottawa)

2009

Location: Mexico City, Mexico

Dates: July 9–16

- First place: Canada (Chris Chiavatti, British Columbia; Peter Brandt, Manitoba; Graham Tompkins, Nova Scotia.)
- Second place: United States (Kenji Golimlim, Southgate, Michigan; Milan Sandhu, Bedford, New Hampshire; Eric Yang, The Colony, Texas.)
- Third place: Poland (Piotr Byrski, Łodygowice, Ślaskie; Wojciech Kaczmarczyk, Racibórz, Ślaskie; Gabriel Stachura, Lublin, Lubelskie.)

2011

Location: San Francisco, California, US

Dates: July 23–28

- First place: Russia (Egor Shustov, Slyudyanka, Irkutsk State; Masha Samoletova, Saint-Petersburg; Alexandr Bondarchuk, Saint-Petersburg.)
- Second place: Canada (Alejandro Torres-Lopez, North Vancouver, British Columbia; Aoife M. O`Leary, Surrey, British Columbia; Alexander E.Cohen, Ottawa, Ontario.)
- Third place: Chinese Taipei (Chen-Luo Cheng, Taipei; Po-Chen Chu, Taitung; Tong-Hong Hsu, Banqiao district, New Taipei)

2013

Location: St. Petersburg, Russia

Dates: July 28–31

- First place: United States (Captain Gopi Ramanathan, Sartell, Minnesota; Asha Jain, Minocqua, Wisconsin; Neelam Sandhu, Bedford, New Hampshire.)
- Second place: Canada (Captain Kyle Richardson, Kitchener, Ontario; Jacob Burnley, Nanaimo, British Columbia; Spencer Zhao, Toronto, Ontario.)
- Third place: India (Captain Apratim Tathagat Singh, Lucknow, Uttar Pradesh; Jayant Abhir, Hisar, Haryana; Utkarsh Gupta, New Delhi.)

2015

Cancelled (Original Location: Stockholm, Sweden)

== Web source ==
Note: These are all from the official page of the National Geographic World Championship.
