= Blue Valley Southwest High School =

Public high school in Overland Park, Kansas

Location
- 17600 South Quivira Road; Overland Park, Kansas 66221; United States; 38.809981°N 94.726015°W

Information
- School type: Public, High School
- Motto: Cultivating lifelong learners prepared to navigate their future with purpose.
- Established: 2010
- School board: Board Website
- School district: Blue Valley USD 229
- CEEB code: 172302
- Principal: Anne Kastelic
- Teaching staff: 77.17 (FTE)
- Grades: 9–12
- Enrollment: 1,057 (2024–2025)
- Student to teacher ratio: 13.70
- Campus: Suburban
- Colors: Forest Green, Black, and Silver
- Athletics conference: Eastern Kansas League
- Mascot: Timberwolf
- Website: https://bvsw.bluevalleyk12.org/

Blue Valley Southwest High School is a fully accredited public high school located in Overland Park, Kansas, United States, and one of five currently operated high schools in the Blue Valley USD 229 school district. The school opened in August 2010. The principal is Anne Kastelic. Its feeder school is Aubry Bend Middle School. In total, Blue Valley Southwest is a 321,000-square-foot (29,800 m^{2}) facility. The school mascot is the Timberwolves and the school colors are forest green, black, and silver.

== Facilities ==
Blue Valley Southwest is sited on a 112-acre (0.45 km^{2}) plot. The 300,000-square-foot (28,000 m^{2}) high school and serves 1,600 students in grades 9–12. The design of the building is organized around a courtyard, with all common spaces: theater lobby, administration, cafeteria, library, and cyber cafe opening directly onto this central space. The courtyard allows students an easy connection to the outdoors, while keeping them safe and secure. Recognizing that students tend to gather in small groups, the sloping courtyard permits several distinct zones: an amphitheater, breakout patio for the theater patrons, open green space, and seating terraces for the library and cafeteria.

The academic area has been organized into four small learning communities. These spaces are designed to move easily between a variety of curricular models: grade level houses, academic departments, or interdisciplinary academies. At the heart of the academic zone is the media center and a distributed administrative suite. The outstretched wings of the academic communities are linked to the library and administrative zone by Flexible Teaching and Learning Areas which allow larger, more flexible teaching spaces for special projects and informal common space.

The new school incorporates many eco-friendly design ideas. Central to this effort is a below floor, quiet, displaced air delivery system which allows improved indoor air quality and thermal comfort while using less energy to deliver conditioned air. The building features a good deal of natural day lighting, with borrow lights throughout the interior, indirect lighting with higher ceilings, and daylight sensors. The building has highly reflective roofing materials and locally produced materials such as Kansas brick and limestone. The school was sited with careful attention to solar orientation to minimize heat gain yet maximize views. An existing pond was enhanced to collect storm water run-off and provide water for irrigation of the surrounding landscape.

== Extracurricular activities ==
=== Athletics ===
Blue Valley Southwest is a member of the Kansas State High School Activities Association and competes in the Eastern Kansas League. Blue Valley Southwest teams compete at the 5A level.

=== State championships ===
State Championships
Season	Sport	Number of Championships	Year
Fall	Soccer, Boys	5	2017, 2018, 2019, 2021, 2024
Fall	Debate	17	2011, 2012, 2014(2), 2015, 2016, 2017(2), 2018, 2019, 2020, 2021, 2022, 2023(2), 2024, 2025
Fall	Cross Country, Boys	2	2022, 2023
Winter	Swimming and Diving, Girls	4	2013, 2014, 2015, 2016
Spring	Baseball	3	2015, 2021, 2022
Spring	Soccer, Girls	2	2017, 2018
Total		31	

== Notable alumni ==
- Yaseen El-Demerdash — Paralympic swimmer for the United States

== See also ==
- List of high schools in Kansas
- List of unified school districts in Kansas

Other high schools in Blue Valley USD 229 school district

- Blue Valley High School in Stilwell
- Blue Valley North High School in Overland Park
- Blue Valley Northwest High School in Overland Park
- Blue Valley West High School in Overland Park
- Blue Valley Academy in Overland Park
