= Blue Valley USD 229 =

Public school district in Overland Park, Kansas

Blue Valley School District, USD 229

Location
- 15020 Metcalf; Overland Park, Kansas 66223 United States
- Coordinates: 38°51′22″N 94°40′06″W

District information
- Type: Public
- Motto: Cultivating lifelong learners prepared to navigate their future with purpose.
- Grades: Pre-K-12
- Established: 1965
- Superintendent: Gillian Chapman
- Accreditation: KSHSAA
- Schools: 40
- Budget: $155,590,528
- NCES District ID: 2012000

Students and staff
- Students: 22,241
- Teachers: 1,819
- Staff: 1,334

Other information
- Website: District website

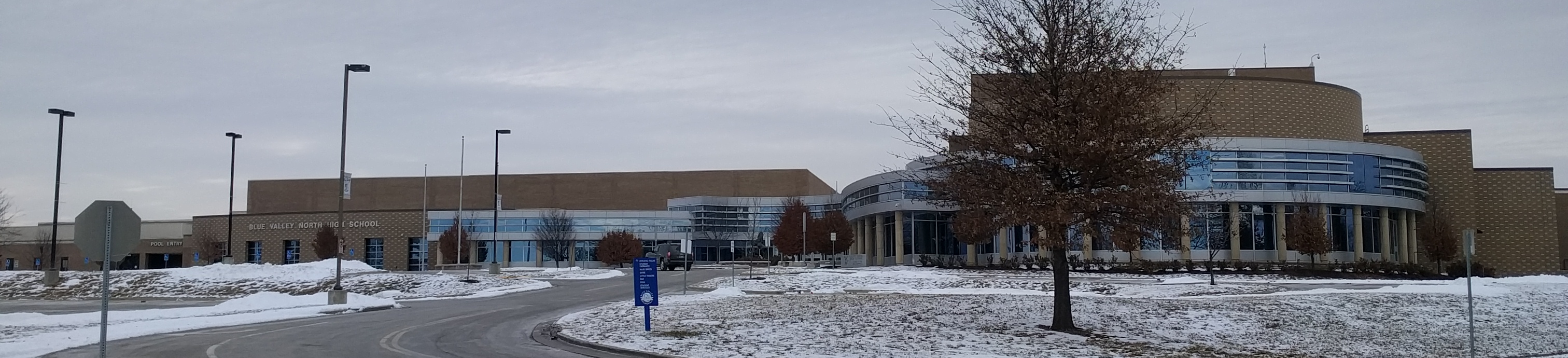
Entrance to Blue Valley North

Blue Valley USD 229 is a public unified school district headquartered in Overland Park, Kansas, United States. It is located in east central and southeast Johnson County, Kansas, and within the Kansas City Metropolitan Area. The district includes sections of Leawood and Olathe, as well as Stilwell, and extends into Miami County.

== Administration ==
The Blue Valley School District is currently under the leadership of Superintendent Gillian Chapman

== School Board ==
The Blue Valley School Board consists of seven board members that currently under the leadership of President Jan Kessinger.

== Schools ==
The school district operates the following schools:

High schools

- Blue Valley High School
- Blue Valley North High School
- Blue Valley Northwest High School
- Blue Valley Southwest High School
- Blue Valley West High School

Middle schools

- Aubry Bend Middle School
- Blue Valley Middle School
- Harmony Middle School
- Lakewood Middle School
- Leawood Middle School
- Overland Trail Middle School
- Oxford Middle School
- Pleasant Ridge Middle School
- Prairie Star Middle School
- Wolf Springs Middle School

Elementary schools

- Aspen Grove Elementary School
- Blue River Elementary School
- Cedar Hills Elementary School
- Cottonwood Point Elementary School
- Harmony Elementary School
- Heartland Elementary School
- Indian Valley Elementary School
- Lakewood Elementary School
- Leawood Elementary School
- Liberty View Elementary School
- Mission Trail Elementary School
- Morse Elementary School
- Oak Hill Elementary School
- Overland Trail Elementary School
- Prairie Star Elementary School
- Stanley Elementary School
- Stilwell Elementary School
- Sunrise Point Elementary School
- Sunset Ridge Elementary School
- Timber Creek Elementary School
- Valley Park Elementary School
- Wolf Springs Elementary School

== Administrative Buildings ==
- Blue Valley Academy
- Blue Valley Center For Advanced Professional Studies
- Blue Valley District Office (Main Office Building, formerly Stanley High School)
- Blue Valley Hilltop Learning Center
- Carolyn Ball Blair Wilderness Science Center

== See also ==
- List of high schools in Kansas
- List of unified school districts in Kansas
