= Blue Valley High School =

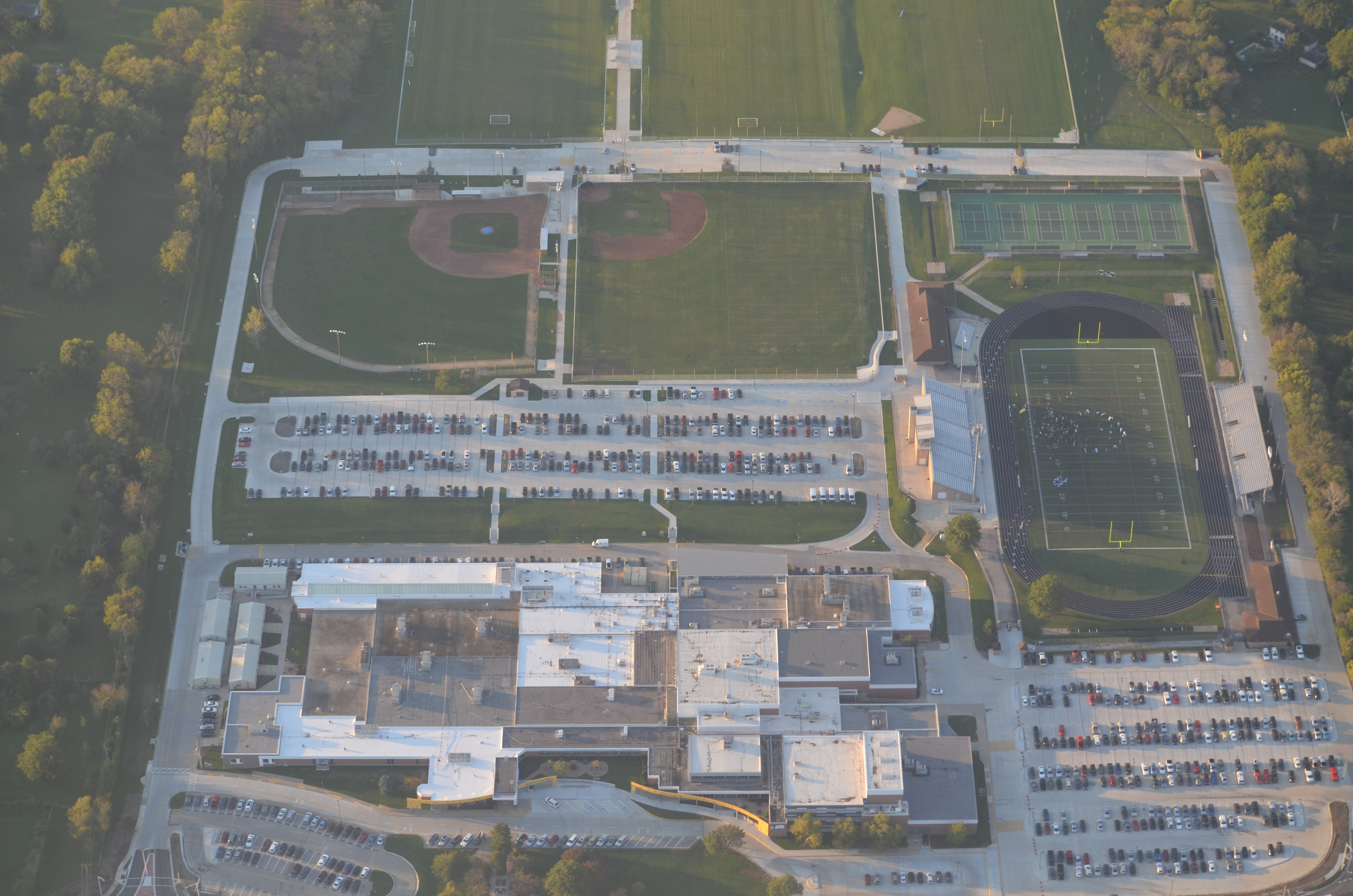
- Aerial view of Blue Valley High School in 2016

Location
- 6001 West 159th Street; Overland Park, Kansas 66085; United States; 38°50′22″N 94°39′19″W

Information
- Type: Public high school
- Established: 1969
- School district: Blue Valley USD 229
- CEEB code: 172820
- Principal: Charles Golden
- Staff: 132
- Teaching staff: 92.53 (FTE)
- Grades: 9 to 12
- Gender: Co-educational
- Enrollment: 1,396 (2024–2025)
- Student to teacher ratio: 15.09
- Hours in school day: 7 hours
- Campus type: Suburban
- Colors: Black and gold
- Athletics: Class 6A; District 4
- Athletics conference: Eastern Kansas
- Mascot: Tigers
- Rival: Blue Valley West
- Accreditation: Blue Ribbon 1988 and 2012.
- Newspaper: Tiger Print
- Website: School website

Blue Valley High School is a 9-12 public high school in Overland Park, Kansas, United States. It is operated by the Blue Valley USD 229 school district.

== History ==
In 1970, Blue Valley High School was the first high school built by the Blue Valley school district.

== Athletics ==
The Tigers compete in the Eastern Kansas League and are classified as a 6A school according to the KSHSAA. Throughout its history, Blue Valley has won 49 state championships in various sports. Many graduates have gone on to participate in collegiate athletics.

=== Football ===
The Blue Valley Tigers have won six state championships, and all six coming in 5A. They have also won EKL 11 times and have had three undefeated seasons.

Volleyball The Blue Valley Tigers won their first state volleyball championship in 2019, finishing 1st in 6A without dropping a set at the state tournament.

==== Marching Band ====
Blue Valley's Marching Band competes in the Kansas Bandmasters Association Open Class Marching Championship. Blue Valley won their first title in 2019. Blue Valley also holds the record for the highest score in KBA history at 92.15 in Finals.

==== Show Choir ====
Blue Valley's Show Choir "Chamber Singers" competes across the United States yearly with numerous appearances in the FAME National Show Choir Championship. Winning their first title in 2024, they've grown, consistently ranking top 50 in the nation annually with their various sets such as "Pinocchio", "Peter Pan and Wendy", and "The Story of Thomas Edison".

=== State championships ===
State Championships
Season	Sport/activity	Number of championships	Year
Fall	Football	6	1991, 1998, 2003, 2006, 2010, 2013
Fall	Cross Country, Boys	1	2014
Fall	Tennis, girls'	1	2010
Fall	Debate, four-speaker	13	1992, 1994, 1995, 2001, 2002, 2003, 2005, 2006, 2008, 2009, 2010, 2014, 2016
Fall	Debate, two-speaker	3	2000, 2005, 2009
Fall	Marching Band	5	2019, 2021, 2022, 2023, 2025
Fall	Cheer (Gameday)	2	2017, 2022
Fall	Volleyball, girls'	1	2019
Winter	Wrestling	1	1997
Winter	Swimming and diving, boys'	6	1986, 1987, 1988, 1991†, 2011, 2012
Spring	Golf, boys'	3	2005, 2021, 2022
Spring	Golf, girls'	2	1977, 1981
Spring	Baseball	7	1992, 2008, 2010, 2014, 2017, 2018, 2021
Spring	Softball	1	1994
Spring	Swimming and diving, girls'	2	2011, 2012
Spring	Tennis, boys'	1	2016
Year-Round	Scholars Bowl	6	2011, 2012, 2013, 2014, 2015, 2016
Year-Round	Speech and Drama	3	1991, 1992, 2017
Total		64	

† 1991 co-champion with another school

== Notable alumni ==
- Will Brennan, professional baseball player
- Adam Hamilton (class of 1982), United Methodist senior pastor and Democratic senator-elect for U.S. senate in the 2026 United States Senate election in Kansas
- Jason Holsman (class of 1994), Commissioner for the Missouri Public Service Commission, member of the Missouri Senate, chairman of the committee on Renewable Energy for the Missouri House of Representatives
- Tara Nott (class of 1990), won a gold medal in Olympic weightlifting during the 2000 Summer Olympics.
- Mason Richman (class of 2020), NFL offensive tackle for the Seattle Seahawks
- Brian Schottenheimer (class of 1992), Head Coach for the Dallas Cowboys, son of former NFL coach Marty Schottenheimer
- Ryne Stanek (class of 2010), professional baseball player
- Michael Stevens (class of 2004), internet personality for YouTube, creator and host of Vsauce
- Justin Swift (class of 1994), former NFL player for the Denver Broncos, San Francisco 49ers and Detroit Lions.
- Leanne Wong (class of 2021), artistic gymnast, five-time World Championship medalist
- The Greeting Committee, indie rock band
- Sam and Colby, paranormal investigators and YouTube duo

== Gallery ==
The entrance to the BV Commons (2005)

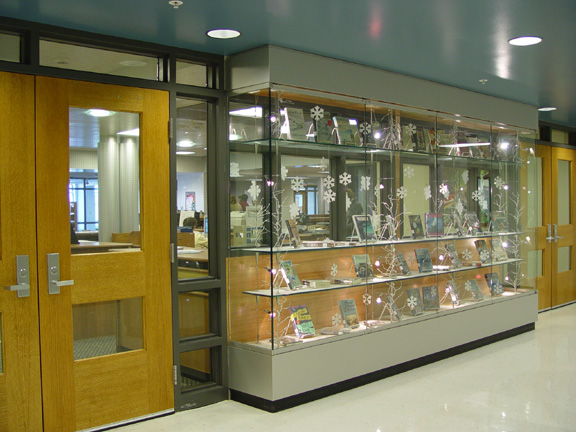
The entrance to the library (2006)

== See also ==
- List of high schools in Kansas
- List of unified school districts in Kansas

Other high schools in Blue Valley USD 229 school district

- Blue Valley North High School in Overland Park
- Blue Valley Northwest High School in Overland Park
- Blue Valley West High School in Overland Park
- Blue Valley Southwest High School in Overland Park
- Blue Valley Academy in Overland Park
