= Blue Valley Academy =

Location
- 7500 West 148th Terrance; Overland Park, Kansas 66223; United States; 38°51′24.2″N 94°40′20.2″W

Information
- Funding type: Public
- School district: Blue Valley USD 229
- NCES District ID: 2012000
- Principal: Valerie Jennings
- Website: School website

Blue Valley Academy is an alternative education school in Overland Park, Kansas. It is located on 148th street, next to Blue Valley USD 229 school district headquarters. Many of the other Blue Valley High Schools act as "parent" schools and many Blue Valley Academy students return to them to take certain electives not offered at the Academy.

The building is also home to many Blue Valley recreation games on its football field and gym. The building was originally home to Blue Valley Middle School before it moved to its current location in 1999.

== See also ==
- List of high schools in Kansas
- List of unified school districts in Kansas

Other high schools in Blue Valley USD 229 school district

- Blue Valley High School in Stilwell
- Blue Valley North High School in Overland Park
- Blue Valley Northwest High School in Overland Park
- Blue Valley West High School in Overland Park
- Blue Valley Southwest High School in Overland Park
