= Blue Valley Northwest High School =

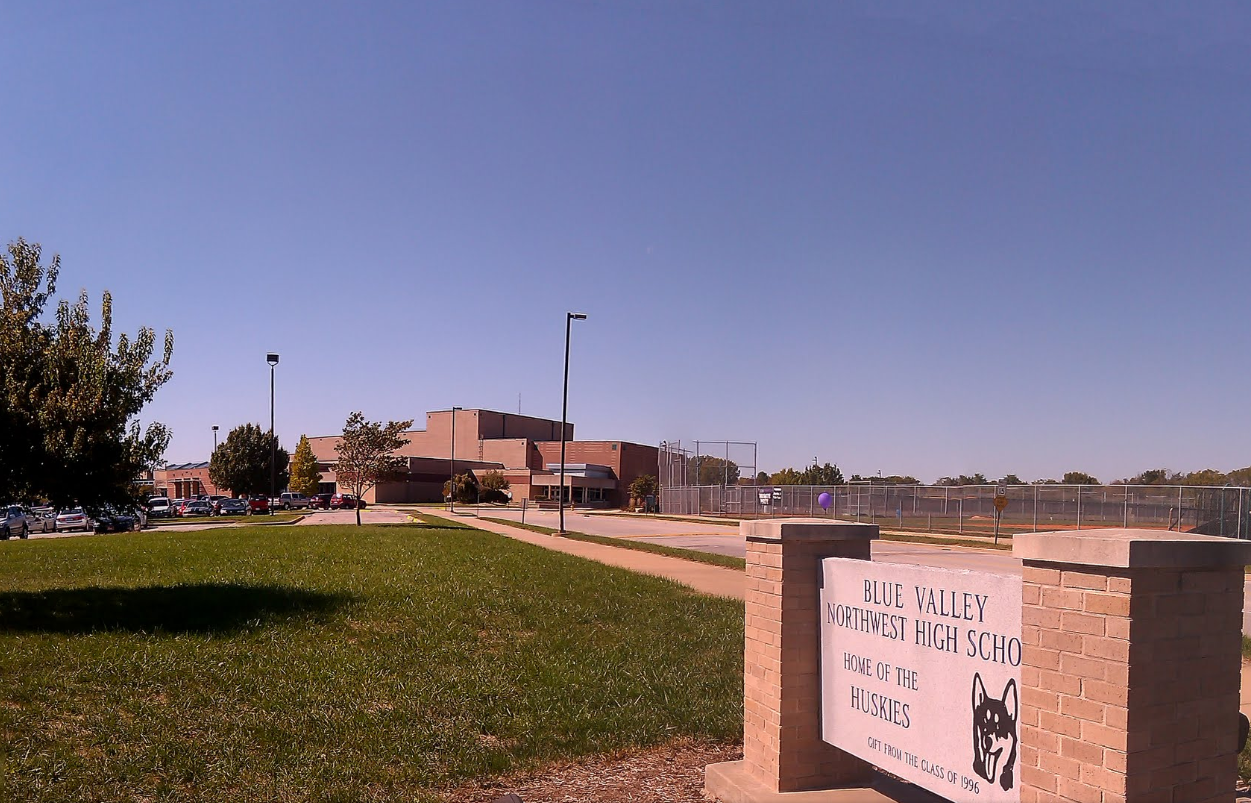

Location
- 13260 Switzer Road; Overland Park, Kansas 66213; United States; 38.8888°N 94.7030°W

Information
- School type: Public, High School
- Motto: Cultivating lifelong learners prepared to navigate their future with purpose.
- Established: 1993
- School district: Blue Valley USD 229
- CEEB code: 172296
- Principal: Tyler Alexander
- Teaching staff: 100.10 (on an FTE basis)
- Grades: 9-12
- Enrollment: 1,496 (2024–2025)
- Student to teacher ratio: 14.95
- Campus: Suburban
- Colors: Purple, Black, White, and Silver
- Athletics conference: Eastern Kansas League
- Nickname: Huskies
- Rivals: Blue Valley North
- Newspaper: The Express
- Yearbook: Horizon
- Website: https://bvnw.bluevalleyk12.org/

Blue Valley Northwest High School (BVNW) is a high school in Overland Park, Kansas, United States. Blue Valley Northwest is one of five high schools operated by Blue Valley USD 229 school district.

Blue Valley Northwest is a member of the Kansas State High School Activities Association and offers a variety of sports programs. Athletic teams compete in the 6A division and are known as the "Huskies". Extracurricular activities are also offered in the form of performing arts, school publications, and clubs.

== Academics ==
Thirteen courses, mainly for motivated freshmen and sophomores, are designated as "Honors" classes. In addition, 17 Advanced Placement courses for college credit are offered. Students taking Honors or Advanced Placement courses receive weighted GPAs.

In 2010, Blue Valley Northwest was selected as one of the six finalists for the first annual Race to the Top High School Commencement Challenge, sponsored by the Department of Education under the Obama administration.

In 2015, Blue Valley Northwest students who attempted the tests achieved an average ACT score of 25.3 out of 36 and an average SAT score of 1370 on a 1600 scale. The class of 2015 also had seven National Merit Finalists and 20 National Advanced Placement Scholars.

== Extracurricular activities ==
The Huskies compete in the Eastern Kansas League and are classified as a 6A-5A school according to the KSHSAA. Throughout its history, Blue Valley Northwest has won several state championships in various sports. Many graduates have gone on to participate in Division I, Division II, and Division III athletics.

=== State championships ===
State Championships
Season	Sport/activity	Number of championships	Year
Fall	Football	1	2021
Fall	Volleyball, girls'	3	1996, 1997, 2000
Fall	Debate, four-speaker	2	1995, 2000
Fall	Debate, two-speaker	1	2021
Fall	Soccer, girls'	4	2011, 2013, 2014, 2015
Fall	Cheer (Gameday)	2	2019, 2021
Winter	Basketball, boys'	6	2013, 2014, 2017, 2018, 2019, 2023
Winter	Swimming and diving, boys'	2	1994, 1996
Spring	Soccer, boys'	3	2006, 2013, 2015
Spring	Golf, boys'	1	2003
Spring	Tennis, boys'	3	2002, 2015, 2016
Spring	Tennis, girls'	2	2000, 2001
Spring	Swimming and diving, girls'	5	1995, 1996, 1997, 1998, 2008
Spring	Cross country, girls'	1	2007
Spring	Total		36

==== Orchestra ====
BVNW's orchestra has received a 1 (the best) ranking every year the school has been open. Students in the orchestra also have auditioned and represented the BVNW in local, state, and national orchestras.

==== Yearbook and newspaper ====
The school's yearbook is called Horizon, the newspaper is called "The Express", the school broadcast news program is called Husky Headlines and the school's literary magazine is called The Muse.

The Horizon and Husky Headlines have been nominated for several Pacemaker awards, and in 2004, the "Horizon" won the Pacemaker Award. The school newspaper, The Express is a member of the High School National Ad Network. At the April 2007 JEA conference in Denver, "The Express" was voted the number one newsmagazine. At the November 2007 JEA conference in Philadelphia, the newsmagazine was rated sixth. In 2015, The Express was nominated for a Pacemaker, but did not win. It did receive sixth place among the competition that year. On November 12, 2016, in Indianapolis, The Express won a Newspaper Pacemaker Award, the first for the publication.

== Notable alumni ==
- Jason Adam, professional baseball player for the San Diego Padres
- Christie Ambrosi, member of the 2000 USA Olympic softball team, who won the gold medal
- Bol Bol, professional basketball player for the Phoenix Suns
- Christian Braun, current basketball player for the Denver Nuggets, former Mr. Kansas Basketball and Kansas Gatorade Player of the Year.
- Arash Ferdowsi, co-founder of Dropbox file hosting service
- Lisa Forbes, Miss Kansas USA 2004 and Miss USA Pageant contestant
- Nathaniel Hackett, former head coach of the Denver Broncos
- Michael McMillian (Class of 1997), actor known for his roles as Henry Gibson on What I Like About You and Steve Newlin on True Blood
- Dániel Sallói, professional soccer player for Sporting Kansas City
- Dalton Schoen, professional football wide receiver

== See also ==
- List of high schools in Kansas
- List of unified school districts in Kansas

Other high schools in Blue Valley USD 229 school district

- Blue Valley High School in Stilwell
- Blue Valley North High School in Overland Park
- Blue Valley West High School in Overland Park
- Blue Valley Southwest High School in Overland Park
- Blue Valley Academy in Overland Park
- High School Confidential
