= Casey Crawford =

American basketball player

Personal information
- Born: October 13, 1987 (age 39) Weymouth, Massachusetts, U.S.
- Listed height: 6 ft 9 in (2.06 m)
- Listed weight: 225 lb (102 kg)

Career information
- High school: Blue Valley North (Overland Park, Kansas)
- College: Wake Forest (2006–08); Colorado (2008–10)

Career history
- 2010–2011: Coventry Crusaders
- 2011: Edmonton Energy
- 2011: Akita Northern Happinets

Casey Crawford (born October 30, 1987) is an American former professional basketball player. He signed to the Canadian team Edmonton Energy in May 2011.

He has played in the FIBA and IBL leagues. He attended Blue Valley North High School 2002–2006, and played collegiately at Wake Forest University (2006–2008) and the University of Colorado Boulder, where he studied political science (2008–2010).

His father Steve Crawford was a Major League Baseball pitcher.

After leaving professional basketball, Crawford entered law school at the University of Missouri–Kansas City School of Law, graduating in 2015. Crawford began his law practice with a local Kansas City law firm, Wallace, Saunders, Austin, Brown & Enochs, Chtd. After a stint with Wallace, Saunders, in 2018, Crawford began working for Chinnery, Evans & Nail, P.C., in Lee's Summit, Missouri, as a transactional and litigation attorney.

== Early life ==
Crawford attended Blue Valley North High School in Overland Park, Kansas from 2002 to 2006, becoming the school's all-time leader in points, rebounds and blocks. He averaged over 29 points, 10.5 rebounds and 4.5 blocks in his senior season for the Mustangs. He was named the Gatorade Player of the Year in 2006 for the State of Kansas.

== College career ==
Crawford signed with Wake Forest University after high school and, after an unsuccessful freshman campaign, he transferred to the University of Colorado under Jeff Bzdelik. In line with NCAA Division I ruling, Crawford sat out the 2007–08 season. For his redshirt-sophomore season he tied a record for most points scored by a transfer in their first game with 14 points against Arkansas Pine Bluff. After up and down playing time, Casey averaged 5.5 points and 1.7 rebounds per game. He was fifth on the team in three-pointers made. His 2009–10 season resulted in similar up and down playing time, ending in averages of 4.6 points and 2.0 rebounds. He shot 45% from the three-point line and had career highs in points (20 points, vs. Nebraska 3/2/2011; and 5 rebounds vs. Colorado Christian). After his junior season, he decided to turn professional and left after graduation.

== College statistics ==
Legend
GP	Games played	GS	Games started	MPG	Minutes per game
FG%	Field goal percentage	3P%	3-point field goal percentage	FT%	Free throw percentage
RPG	Rebounds per game	APG	Assists per game	SPG	Steals per game
BPG	Blocks per game	PPG	Points per game	**Bold**	Career high

Year	Team	GP	GS	MPG	FG%	3P%	FT%	RPG	APG	SPG	BPG	PPG
2006–07	Wake Forest	9	0	3.1	.400	.250	.000	0.44	0.44	0.00	0.22	1.11
2007–08	N/A											
2008–09	Colorado	25	4	14.2	.413	.328	.739	1.72	0.60	0.48	0.12	5.52
2009–10	Colorado	26	3	13.8	.441	.444	.765	2.04	0.46	0.42	0.27	4.58
Career		60	7	12.4	.424	.373	.750	1.67	0.52	0.38	0.20	4.45

== Professional career ==
After unsuccessful pre-season tryouts with various NBA Development League teams (Reno Bighorns, Sioux Falls Skyforce, Iowa Energy), Crawford was signed in November by the Coventry Crusaders of the English Basketball League Division 1 team. Crawford averaged 25.8 points, 10 rebounds, shot 41.9% from 3pt, 51.6% fg, 1.4 bpg, 2.0 apg, 95% FT for the season with the Crusaders. After nine games with the team, the Coventry Crusaders closed due to lack of funds from ownership. In May 2011, Crawford signed with the Canadian team Edmonton Energy.

In August 2011, Crawford signed with the Japanese professional team Akita Northern Happinets of the bj league. In his first pre-season game, he tallied 30 points against the Chiba Jets.

== Publications ==
Crawford's legal writings have been published twice (2014, 2015), with the University of Missouri-Kansas City Law School's Urban Lawyer and Law Review, respectively.
