= Australian Geography Competition =

The Australian Geography Competition is an Australia-wide competition run by the Royal Geographical Society of Queensland and the Australian Geography Teachers Association and sponsored by the National Geographic Channel. It tests the geographic knowledge of high school students from years 8-12. It starts with a written multiple choice test in early March. In the under 16 competition the winners from each state & the territories (Australian Capital Territory, Northern Territory, Cocos Islands) are taken as well as a runner up who has the highest score after these winners. These people are flown to Sydney at the start of June for a weekend of sightseeing followed by the national final. The winners go on to the National Geographic World Championship to represent Australia. The competition is also used to select the members of the Australian team for the International Geography Olympiad.

== Winners of the Intermediate Division ==
=== 2001 ===
- 1st Andrew Jones (Brisbane, Queensland)
- 2nd Andrew Peters (Gulgong, New South Wales)
- 3rd Campbell Mackenzie (Perth, Western Australia)

=== 2002 ===
- 1st Daniel Kluger-Wynne (Melbourne, Victoria)
- 2nd Patrick Cocotti-Larkin (Canberra, Australian Capital Territory)

=== 2003 ===
- 1st David Rooney (Adelaide, South Australia)
- 2nd Jose Molina Santos (Geraldton, Western Australia)

=== 2004 ===
- 1st Chris McCanna (Gold Coast, Queensland)
- 2nd Stephen Squires (Adelaide, South Australia)
- 3rd Michael Trayanovski (Melbourne, Victoria)

=== 2005 ===
- 1st Norman Ma (Sydney, New South Wales)
- 2nd Michael Memeo (Perth, Western Australia)
- 3rd Angus Sandford (Darwin, Northern Territory)

=== 2006 ===
- 1st Roman Zethoven (Melbourne, Victoria)
- 2nd Liam Baker (Canberra, Australian Capital Territory)
- 3rd Mathew Beddard (Gold Coast, Queensland)

=== 2007 ===
- 1st Mathew Beddard (Gold Coast, Queensland)
- 2nd David Vasak (Sydney, New South Wales)
- 3rd David Johnson (Sydney, New South Wales)

=== 2009 ===
- 1st Nick Montgomery (Melbourne, Victoria)
- 2nd Tim House (Sydney, New South Wales)
- 3rd James Gillard (Canberra)

=== 2010 ===
- 1st Riley Kernaghan (Brisbane, Queensland)
- 2nd Allan McManus (Adelaide, South Australia)
- 3rd Tiffany Wu (Sydney, New South Wales), Chris Krushka (Hobart, Tasmania), Amelia Rowe (Maldon, Victoria)
