= Nikolai Mushegian =

American computer scientist

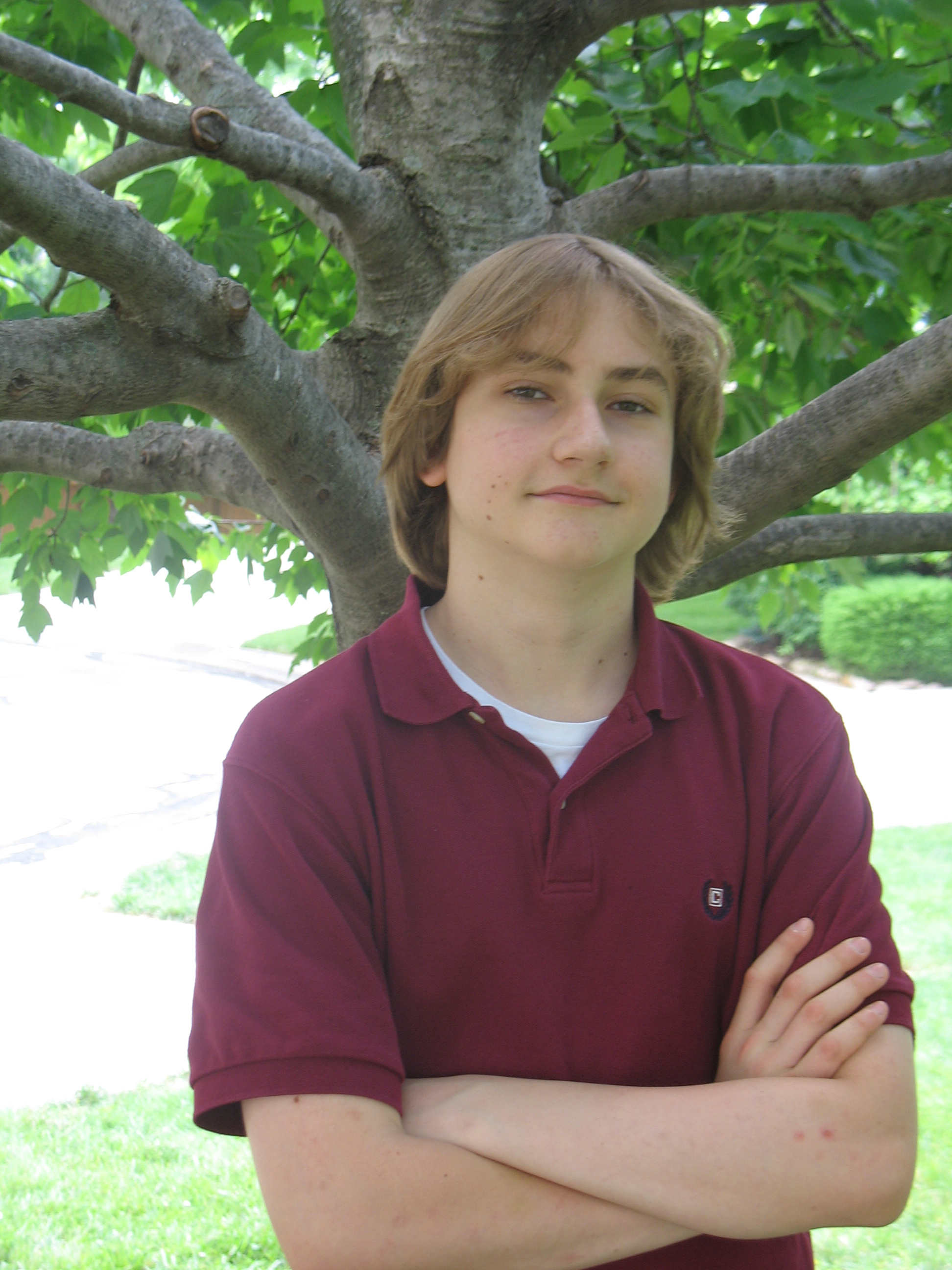
- Born: March 28, 1993; Lexington, Kentucky
- Died: October 28, 2022 (aged 29); San Juan, Puerto Rico
- Occupations: Computer scientist, software engineer, philanthropist

Nikolai Mushegian (March 28, 1993 – October 28, 2022) was an American computer scientist and software engineer, best known for his contributions to software platforms supporting decentralized autonomous organizations and decentralized finance.

== Biography ==
=== Early life and education ===
Mushegian was born in 1993 in Lexington, Kentucky. His parents, both life scientists, immigrated to the United States from the Soviet Union in 1991. Mushegian had Ukrainian, Armenian and Russian ancestry. His paternal great-grandfather, Tigran Mushegian (Musheghyan), was rector (president) of Yerevan State University (Armenian National University) in 1933-1935. Mushegian attended Blue Valley North High School in Overland Park, Kansas, where he was recognized for academic achievements and as a multi-instrumentalist musician and drum major of the school marching band.

Following high school, Mushegian attended Carnegie Mellon University, graduating in 2014 from the School of Computer Science with a B.Sc. in Computer Science with a minor in Mathematics. While at Carnegie Mellon, Mushegian became fascinated by the use of cryptography to maintain decentralized records that cannot be changed retroactively. Because the university was not offering courses in the foundations of blockchain technology at that time, Mushegian designed such a course and taught it to his peers in 2014 through Carnegie Mellon Student College.

=== Career ===
After graduation, Mushegian went to work full time for the BitShares project, which he had been involved with since his time at Carnegie Mellon. Bitshares was developing blockchain applications beyond cryptocurrency, extending the use cases to other peer-to-peer networks that must maintain trustworthy records in the absence of a central authority. Starting as a developer, Mushegian was then put in charge of the BitShares DNS project, which was an early attempt to build a decentralized Internet Domain Names Service based on blockchain.

In 2015, Mushegian started Nexus/DappHub, a consulting business, where he developed a set of utilities for building smart contracts on the Ethereum platform.

The same year, Mushegian and Rune Christensen co-founded MakerDAO, the first decentralized stablecoin project on the Ethereum Blockchain. Mushegian designed and built the Single-Collateral Dai system, which was deployed by MakerDAO in December 2017 as the official launch of Dai. Mushegian was involved in researching and writing the Dai Purple Paper, which specified the design of the Multi-Collateral Dai upgrade.

Shortly before the launch of MakerDAO, the first DAO deployed by Ethereum suffered a hacker attack. Mushegian is credited for identifying a vulnerability in most smart contracts designs; he engineered critical security features into the smart contract architecture, which prevented similar hacks in MakerDAO.

In 2016, Mushegian led the team that developed Wrapped Ether (WETH), an Ethereum token compatible with the ERC-20 standard, and designed protection against another vulnerability discovered shortly before.

After Mushegian's departure from MakerDAO, in 2019 he co-authored, with Fernando Martinelli, the Balancer white paper. Balancer is the first decentralized exchange capable of supporting n-dimensional price surfaces, an “automated market maker with ... key properties that cause it to function as a self-balancing weighted portfolio and price sensor”; the white paper presents the mathematical proof of those properties.

In 2020, Mushegian co-founded the RAI project, a DAO which generates the Rai stablecoin, the first stablecoin to have a scalable, purely crypto-backed design.

In 2022, Mushegian co-founded RICO, a next generation stablecoin project with its own blockchain and autonomous multi-collateral capabilities in a minimalist design.

=== Death ===
Mushegian left his home near Condado Beach in San Juan in the early morning of October 28, 2022, and was last seen walking towards the beach. Mushegian’s body was found on the nearby reef later the same day. The police investigation found no foul play.

== Public persona and reputation ==
Mushegian was active in professional chat groups and message boards, as well as on Twitter. The main themes of his posts included critiques of established financial systems and of their role in maintaining income inequality and political control; disdain for the incompetence of the majority of blockchain investors, whom he called LARPers; thorn-in-the-flesh-style commentary on various blockchain and cryptocurrency platforms; and discussions of personal issues, such as aphantasia, mental health concerns and fear of unnatural death.

Mushegian summarized his thoughts and approaches to code development in online posts, some of which were compiled by others after his death as a tribute to him.

After Mushegian’s death in 2022, in eulogies and commemorations published online, he was called “a cypherpunk, one of a few that remained active in the crypto community.... noble in the cause”, "a complicated individual, but nothing short of a visionary", and someone giving inspiration by his “fierce commitment to the truth, even when others don’t yet understand.” In January 2024, the first blockchain-based mobile game, Spells of Genesis, released a monthly card "Nikola The Magician" in Mushegian's memory. The release note called Mushegian an "extraordinary visionary", "a pioneering entrepreneur and a fervent technology enthusiast", and "a brilliant mind that helped shape the future".

== Philanthropy ==
In 2019, Mushegian gifted MKR tokens valued at ~$1.4 million to his alma mater The School of Computer Science at Carnegie Mellon University. The gift was used to establish the Mushegian Research Fund and the Mushegian Endowed Computer Science Fellowship, both supporting research in cryptography, game theory and algorithm design.

In 2021, Mushegian bought a 288-acre (~1,17 square kilometers) plot of land adjacent to El Yunque National Forest for $2.2 million, and in 2022 he pledged to donate the plot to the United States Forest Service in order to support land and ecosystem conservation in Puerto Rico. The donation, thought to be the largest land donation to El Yunque in several decades, was completed by Nikolai's parents after his death.
