= Blue Valley Center For Advanced Professional Studies =

Blue Valley Center For Advanced Professional Studies (BV CAPS)

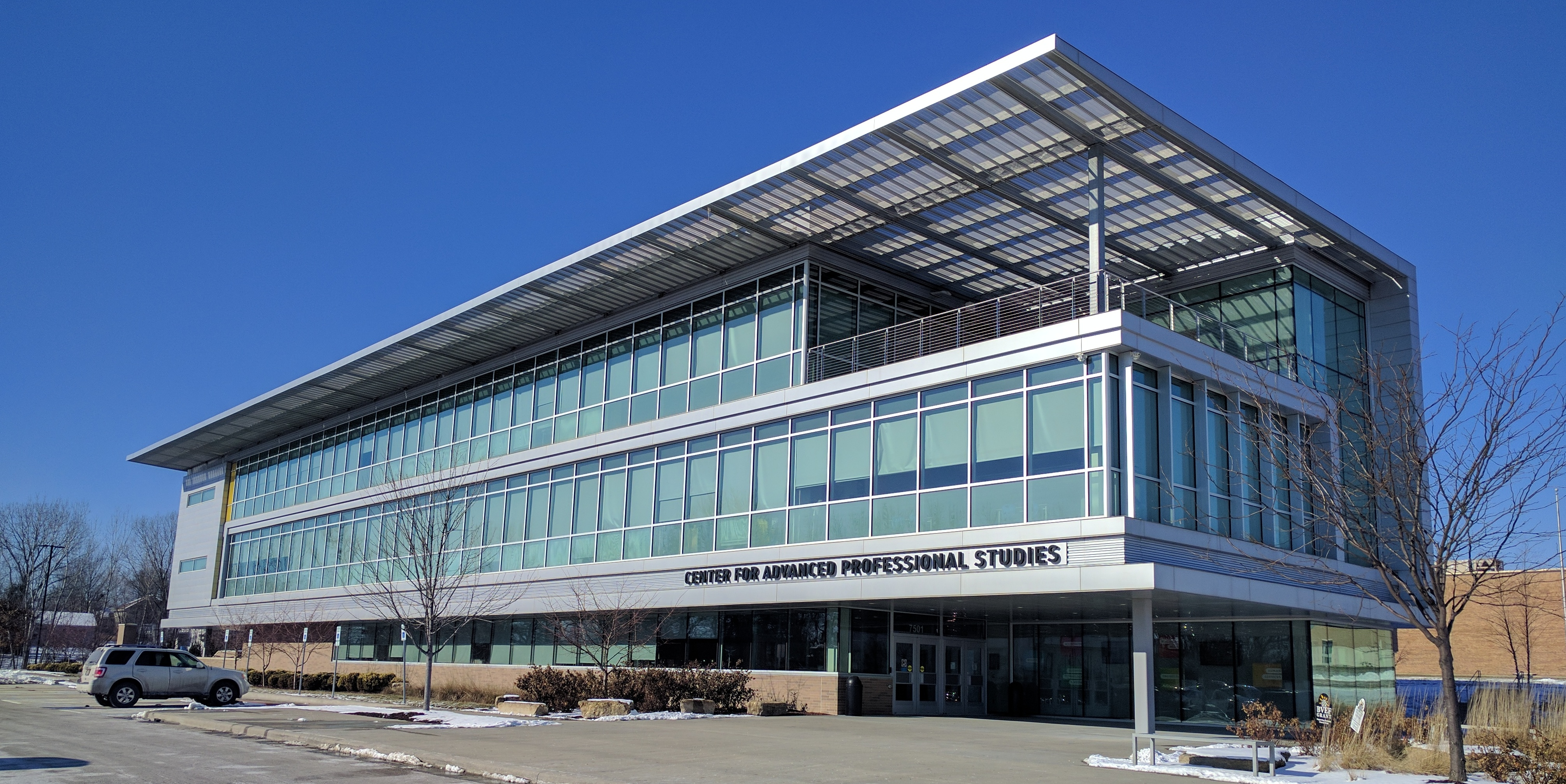

Location
- 7501 West 149th Terrace; Overland Park, Kansas 66223; United States; 38.8563088°N 94.6725645°W

Information
- Funding type: Public school
- Motto: Cultivating lifelong learners prepared to navigate their future with purpose.
- School district: Blue Valley
- NCES District ID: 2012000
- Superintendent: Todd White
- Executive Director: Corey Mohn
- Faculty: 9
- Teaching staff: 21
- Grades: 11-12
- Classes offered: Accelerator, Bioscience, Business, Engineering, Healthcare, Human Services, and Media
- Newspaper: CAPtivate Magazine
- Website: https://caps.bluevalleyk12.org/

Blue Valley Center for Advanced Professional Studies (CAPS) is a high school program which operates multiple different magnet programs for students who live within the Blue Valley School District, regardless of whether they attend a Blue Valley school. Each course takes one semester and takes up half of the student's day, with the rest of their time spent at their home high school.

== Courses and Clubs ==
=== Accelerator ===
- Global Food Industries
- Innovate

=== Biosciences ===
- Molecular Medicine and Bioengineering
- Environmental Science
- Bioscience Research
- CAPS Bioclub

=== Business, Technology, and Media ===
- Global Business
- World Language & Business Leadership
- Digital Design and Photography
- Filmmaking
- Multimedia Journalism
- Technology Solutions

=== Engineering ===
- Engineering
- FIRST Robotics Competition Team 2410

=== Human Services ===
- American Justice: for All
- Teacher Education

=== Medicine & Healthcare ===
- Foundations of Medicine I
- Foundations of Medicine II
- Sports Medicine
- Exploring Health Professions

== Robotics ==
In 2010, FRC Team 2410, named the Metal Mustangs, from Blue Valley North High School moved to the facility. Since then, two FIRST Tech Challenge teams have also been started, named the Cobalt Colts FTC 6547 and Metal Mavericks FTC 11874. The Cobalt Colts won the 2019 FTC World Championship.
