= Andrew Wojtanik =

American author and political scientist

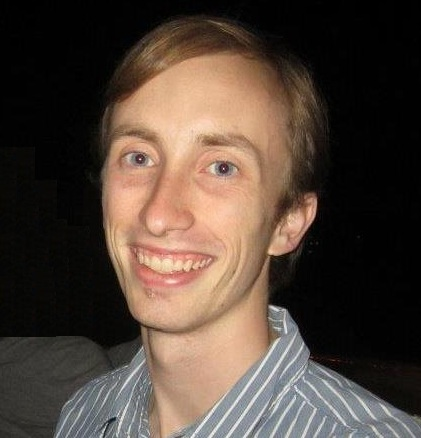
Andrew Wojtanik

Andrew Wojtanik is an American author, political scientist, and past winner of the National Geographic Bee, a geography competition for fourth- through eight-grade students. His book, The National Geographic Bee Ultimate Fact Book: Countries A to Z, was based on the "monstrous packet" of study notes he compiled to win the Bee at age 14. He currently researches and writes about elite politics and regime decision-making in Sub-Saharan Africa.

== Background ==
Wojtanik grew up in Overland Park, Kansas, where he attended Lakewood Middle School. At age 14, he won the 2004 National Geographic Bee hosted by Alex Trebek, earning a $25,000 college scholarship. At the time, he attributed his success to a 432-page almanac he had compiled for himself. He went on to win the National Geographic World Championship in 2005, as part of a team of three teenagers representing the United States at the competition in Hungary.

Following his win, Wojtanik worked with National Geographic staff to turn his notes into a study guide for other children preparing for the Bee. The result was Afghanistan to Zimbabwe: Country Facts That Helped Me Win the National Geographic Bee, published in paperback in 2005. His second book, The National Geographic Bee Ultimate Fact Book: Countries A to Z, was published in hardcover in 2012.

Wojtanik went on completed a bachelor of science degree in international politics at the Georgetown University School of Foreign Service in 2012. He worked as a researcher at the Harvard Kennedy School. As of 2024, he is a PhD candidate in political science at the University of California at Berkeley, studying politics in Sub-Saharan Africa.

== Reception ==
Library Media Connection called The National Bee Ultimate Fact Book "a handy book to have around for basic facts", particularly for social studies teachers, and "a good resource for daily trivia questions or area reviews". School Library Journal rated the 2012 edition as a purchase librarians would not regret, noting that it includes fast facts, maps for visual context, and information on current world politics for 195 countries. A review in Voice of Youth Advocates said that "The data has been chosen and displayed in the most convenient format to study for the National Geographic Bee, in which over five million students participate, but it also serves as an excellent reference for all kinds of geographic questions."

== Publications ==
- Afghanistan to Zimbabwe, by Andrew Wojtanik (ISBN 0-7922-7981-6)
- The National Geographic Bee Ultimate Fact Book (ISBN 978-1426309472)

Preceded by Benjamin S. Detrixhe	Kansas State Geographic Bee winner 2003 - 2004	Succeeded by Benjamin S. Detrixhe
Preceded by James Williams	National Geographic Bee winner 2004	Succeeded by Nathan Cornelius
