= Liceo scientifico =

Type of secondary school in Italy

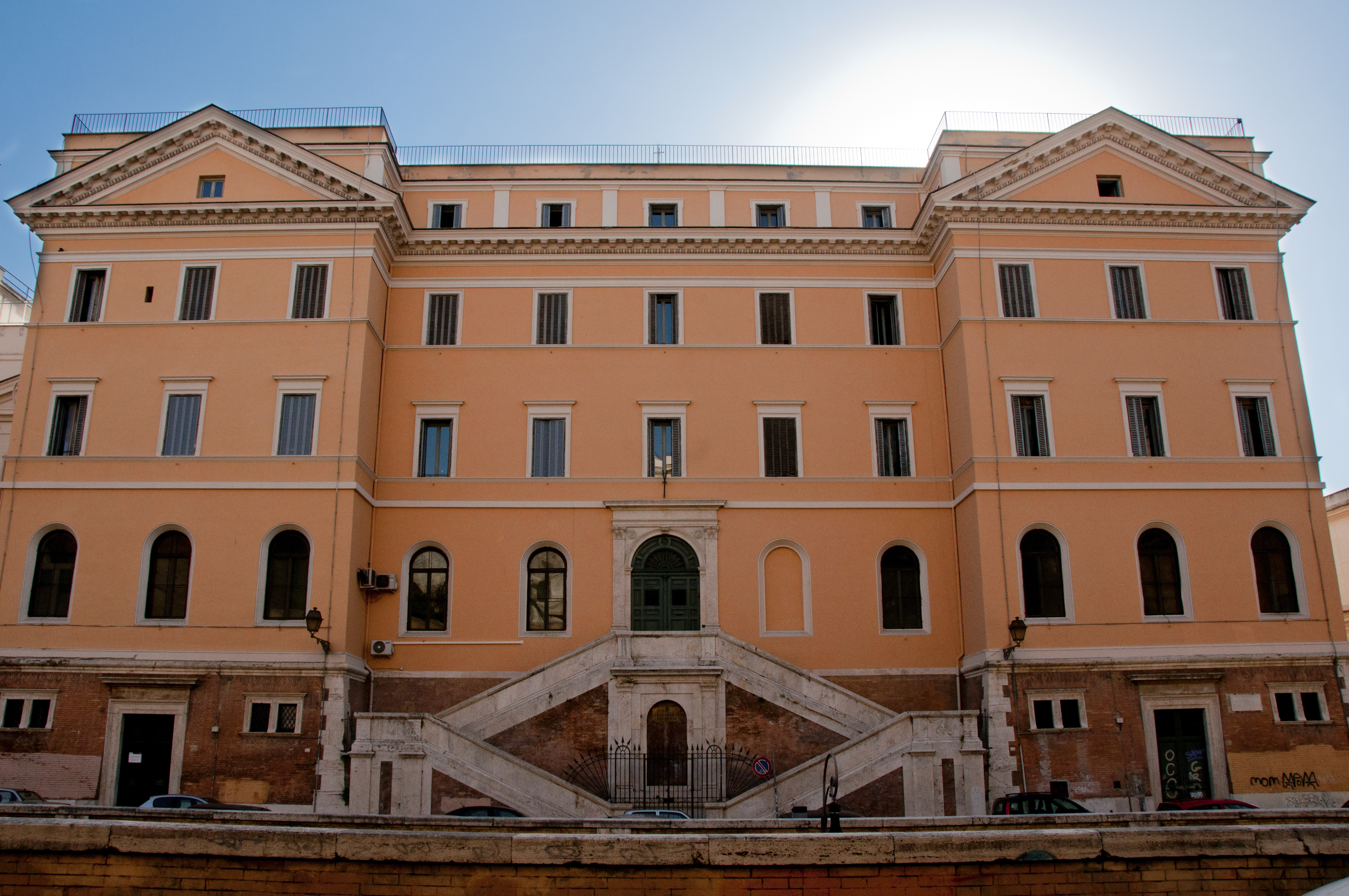
Liceo scientifico statale Camillo Cavour in Rome

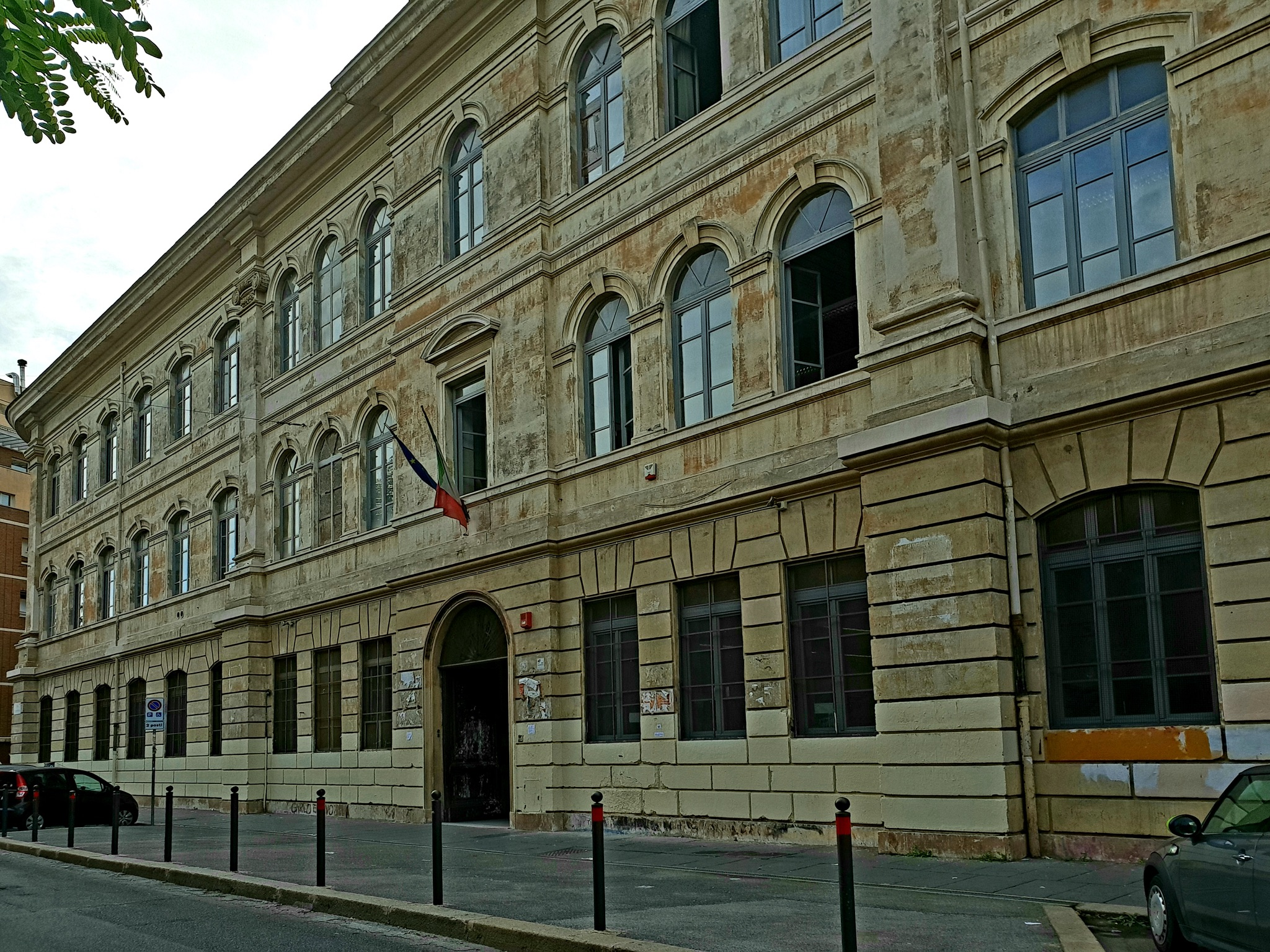
Liceo scientifico statale Augusto Righi in Rome

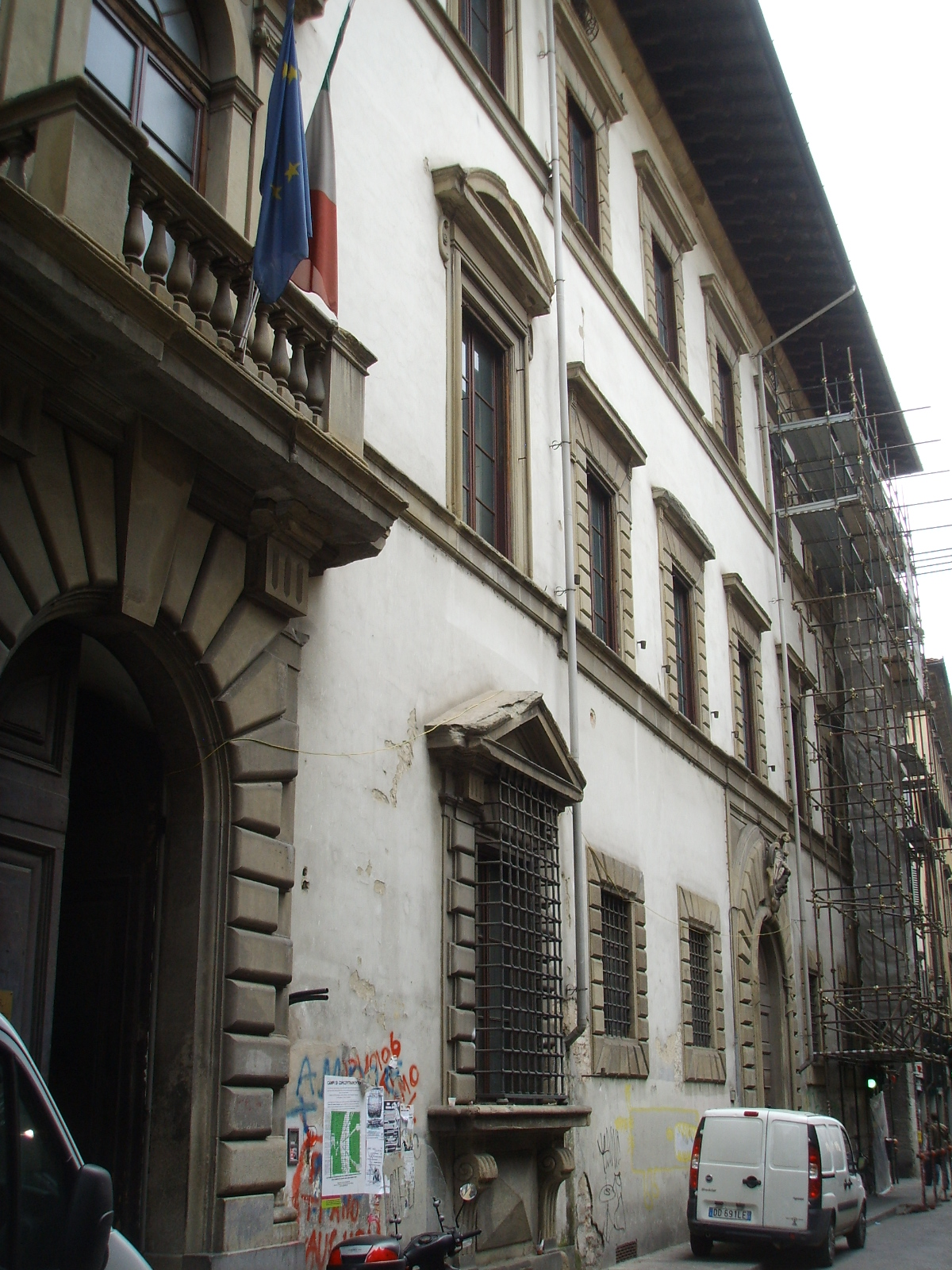
Liceo scientifico statale Niccolò Machiavelli in Florence

Liceo scientifico (Italian: [liˈtʃɛːo ʃʃenˈtiːfiko]; lit. 'scientific lyceum') is a type of secondary school in Italy. It is designed to give students the skills to progress to any university or higher educational institution. Students can attend the liceo scientifico after successfully completing middle school (scuola media).

The curriculum is devised by the Ministry of Education, and emphasises the link between the humanistic tradition and scientific culture. It covers a complete and widespread range of disciplines, including Italian language and literature, mathematics, physics, chemistry, biology, anatomy, Earth science, astronomy, history, geography, philosophy, Latin language and Latin literature, English language and English literature, physical education, art history and technical drawing. Students typically study for five years, and attend the school from the age of 14 to 19. At the end of the fifth year all students sit for the esame di Stato, a final examination which leads to the maturità scientifica.

A student attending a liceo is called "liceale", although the more generic terms studente (male) and studentessa (female) are also in common use. Teachers are known as professore (male) or professoressa (female).

== History ==
The Liceo Cavour was established in 1871 as the Physics and Mathematics branch of the Regio Istituto Tecnico di Roma (which later became the Istituto Tecnico-Commerciale Leonardo Da Vinci). After the Gentile Reform in 1923, this school became the Regio Liceo Scientifico di Roma, under the royal legislative decree of 9 September 1923, n. 1915. It was founded in 1923-24, as the scientific branch of liceo classico Ennio Quirino Visconti, the first liceo classico in Rome. In 1926 the Regio Liceo Scientifico di Roma was established as an independent body, starting teaching in 1926-27. In 1946, with the inauguration of the Liceo Scientifico Statale Augusto Righi (a branch of the Regio Liceo), the school was renamed "Liceo Scientifico Camillo Cavour".

Among the more famous people to have worked here were the poet Margherita Guidacci, English language and literature teacher from 1965 to 1975, Gioacchino Gesmundo, History and Philosophy teacher from 1934 to 1944, and the physicist Bruno Pontecorvo (who was part of the group of physicists and scientists named 'I Ragazzi di Via Panisperna', translated as Via Panisperna Boys) with his younger brother Umberto. Notable former students include Franca Falcucci, the future Minister of public education, and Marta Russo, whose murder garnered huge media attention. Maria Montessori also graduated here with a degree in physics and mathematics in 1889 while the school was still referred to as Istituto Tecnico-Commerciale Leonardo Da Vinci.

=== The law Daneo-Credaro ===
A Royal Commission established in 1906 presented a reform plan that included, among other things, three five-year high schools:

- the liceo classico ("classical lyceum"), which was based on the then existing liceo – established by the Casati law – and was characterized by the teaching of classical languages (Ancient Greek and Latin, from which is based the Italian language); allowed access to any university faculty;
- the liceo moderno ("modern lyceum"), without Greek, with the strengthening of the foreign language (French), with the teaching of a second foreign language (German or English), of the law and the economy; it did not allow access to the Faculty of Letters;
- the liceo scientifico ("scientific lyceum"), without classical languages, with the teaching of a second foreign language and a strengthening of scientific subjects; it did not allow access to the Faculties of Letters and Jurisprudence.

The proposal was accepted by the minister Luigi Credaro in 1911 (Daneo-Credaro law). See the entry history of education in Italy for further details.

Disciplines	Classico						Moderno						Scientifico					
Disciplines	I	II	III	IV	V	TOT	I	II	III	IV	V	TOT	I	II	III	IV	V	TOT
Italian	5	4	4	4	4	21	5	4	4	4	4	21	5	4	4	4	4	21
Latin	8	6	6	6	6	32	6	5	4	4	3	22	-	-	-	-	-	0
(Ancient) Greek	-	5	5	5	5	20	-	-	-	-	-	0	-	-	-	-	-	0
French	3	2	-	-	-	5	4	2	2	2	2	12	3	2	-	-	-	5
English or German	-	-	-	-	-	0	-	5	4	3	3	15	3	3	3	3	3	15
History	3	3	3	3	3	15	3	3	3	3	3	15	3	3	3	3	3	15
Geography	2	2	2	-	-	6	2	2	2	2	-	8	2	2	2	2	2	10
Philosophy	-	-	3	2	3	8	-	-	3	2	3	8	-	-	3	2	3	8
Mathematics	2	2	2	2	2	10	2	2	2	2	2	10	5	5	5	5	5	25
Physics	-	-	-	3	2	5	-	-	-	3	3	6	-	-	3	3	3	9
Chemistry	-	-	2	-	-	2	-	-	2	-	-	2	3	3	-	-	-	6
Natural history	2	2	-	-	2	6	2	2	-	-	2	6	2	2	2	2	2	10
Law and political economy	-	-	-	-	-	0	-	-	-	3	3	6	-	-	-	-	-	0
Drawing	-	-	-	-	-	0	2	2	-	-	-	4	2	2	2	2	2	10
Physical education (Sports)	2	2	2	2	2	10	2	2	2	2	2	10	2	2	2	2	2	10
Total hours per week	27	28	29	27	29	130	28	29	28	30	30	135	30	28	29	28	29	134

=== Gentile reform ===
The liceo scientifico was confirmed, but radically modified, in 1923 with the Gentile reform, which at the same time suppressed the liceo moderno and the physical-mathematical section of the Regio Istituto Tecnico (Royal Technical Institute). The course was of four years and ended with the Diploma, an extremely demanding state exam with five written tests (Italian, Latin, mathematics, foreign language and drawing) and an oral interview-test (which covered all the subjects studied in the last three years of the course), lasting one hour, in two sessions: one for the literary subjects and one for the scientific subjects.

After the first four years of one of the three lower secondary schools, the continuation of the studies (ginnasio, lower technical institute and the istituto magistrale inferiore) were allowed, after passing an entrance examination.

The original liceo scientifico was evidently derived from the ginnasio-liceo (gymnasium-lyceum) (the current liceo classico), but compared to this it had the disadvantage of not allowing access to studies of letters and philosophy and above all of jurisprudence whose degree course, in addition to presenting some specific professions (judiciary, advocacy, notary) was attended by most of those who held positions of command. The proposal of the Gentile liceo scientifico was examined by a Commission of the Accademia dei Lincei which deprecated the unification of disparate subjects and the fact that, despite the name of "scientific", it had very little science, especially when compared to the physical-mathematical section of the Regio Istituto Tecnico, which had just been deleted. And indeed, calculating the total weekly hours over the four years, the main subjects were Latin (16 hours), then Italian, foreign language and mathematics (14 hours).

Also, it should be considered that, at the time, the three lower-secondary-schools that allowed the continuation of the studies (the ginnasio, the istituto tecnico inferiore and the istituto magistrale inferiore), were preparatory to many secondary schools (liceo, istituto tecnico superiore and istituto magistrale superiore). In this outline, without an "own" lower-secondary-school counterpart, the liceo scientifico was inserted, which was accessible both from the ginnasio and, after the admission examination, from the istituto tecnico or the istituto magistrale. This meant that to attend the liceo scientifico it was necessary to "change" school, even physically because the lower-secondary-schools were housed in the same buildings of the respective higher-secondary-schools, with which they constituted a single course of study. This change was unnatural both for those who attended the gymnasium, which folded on a de fact "inferior"-school because already at the beginning precluded some prestigious professional outlets, both for those who attended the other two institutes, and after four years of study had to give up at a title immediately expendable in the way of work to go to attend a high school, which evidently required quite another application, moreover with a demanding entrance examination.

For all these reasons, the liceo scientifico had a little success so much that, in a city like Rome, the second liceo scientifico (the Liceo scientifico "Augusto Righi") arrived only in 1946.

timetable outline

Liceo scientifico (1923 - 1940)	I	II	III	IV
Italian language	4	4	3	3
Latin language	3	4	4	4
Foreign language	4	4	3	3
History	3	3	2	2
Philosophy	-	-	4	4
Mathematics	5	3	3	3
Physics	-	2	3	3
Natural sciences	3	3	2	2
Drawing and art history	3	2	2	2
Total hours per week	25	25	26	26

=== Bottai reform ===
The structure of the liceo scientifico changed in 1940, when the Bottai reform established the single three-years scuola media and the access to the high schools was rationalized; those who wanted to attend the liceo scientifico did not have to change schools, or rather, at the end of lower-secondary-school, everyone had to change schools to attend the chosen secondary school. The liceo scientifico began to establish itself and the number of students grew steadily until reaching the number of students of the liceo classico. Persisted the prohibition on signing in letters and jurisprudence faculties.

Because of the war events, the timetable has been altered several times and the final one will only be in 1952.

Apart from a few tweaks to the timetable, a consequence of the extension of the liceo to a five-year type, the new course reproduced the previous course. The most important subject for number of hours remained Latin (20), then Italian (19), mathematics (18) and foreign language (17).

In 1962 it was established that the scientific examination was valid for the signing into any faculty-excluded letters; it allowed the signation also into the jurisprudence faculty.

From 1969 onwards, when access to university was liberalized, there was a real boom at the liceo scientifico, so much that at the approval of the Gelmini reform (2010), among the students signed in the last year of the course, the liceo scientifico had 103,000 students compared to 51,000 of the liceo classico Nowadays the liceo scientifico, among the Italian high schools, is the one that welcomes the relative majority of students (22 percent, of which more than half are females).

The substantial prevalence of Latin with respect to the same scientific-mathematical subjects and the greater number of students enrolled in the liceo scientifico have meant that Italy is still, among Western countries, the one in which Latin is more studied (40 percent of signed in high schools, of which more than half at the liceo scientifico), which has caused quite a few controversies.

Timetable outline

Liceo scientifico (1952 - 2010)	Biennium		Triennium		
Liceo scientifico (1952 - 2010)	I	II	III	IV	V
Italian language and literature	4	4	4	3	4
Latin language and literature	4	5	4	4	3
Foreign language and literature	3	4	3	3	4
History	3	2	2	2	3
Geography	2	-	-	-	-
Philosophy	-	-	2	3	3
Mathematics	5	4	3	3	3
Physics	-	-	2	3	3
Natural sciences (Natural science, chemistry and astronomy)	-	2	3	3	2
Drawing and History of art	1	3	2	2	2
Physical education	2	2	2	2	2
Catholic religion or alternative activities	1	1	1	1	1
Total hours per week	25	27	28	29	30

=== Sperimentazioni (1970–2010) ===
Sperimentazioni were alternative experimental curriculum bands offered in Liceo scientifico.These specialisms were based on the official curriculum, but enriched by increasing the number of hours dedicated to one or more subjects, or including new subjects. They started in the 1970s, when more local autonomy was granted. Schools could offer one or more specialism. When the Gelmini reform (2010) came into force, practically all the high schools were offering these experimental streams.

The most widespread alternative streams were:

- P.N.I. ("National Plan of Computer studies" specialism)
- bilinguismo (Bilinguism specialism)
- scienze naturali (Natural sciences specialism).
- con studi musicali riconosciuti (Alternative with recognised musical studies)
- sportiva (Sports specialism)
- umanistica (Humanistic specialism)
- scientifico-tecnologica (Brocca) (Scientific-technological specialism)
- scientifico-biologica (Brocca) (Scientific-biological specialism)
- P.N.I. con bilinguismo (P.N.I. specialism with bilingualism)

==== P.N.I. ====
Liceo scientifico (up to 2010) sperimentazione P.N.I.	Biennium		Triennium		
Liceo scientifico (up to 2010) sperimentazione P.N.I.	I	II	III	IV	V
Italian language and literature	4	4	4	4	4
Latin language and literature	4	5	4	3	3
Foreign language and literature	3	4	3	3	4
History	3	2	2	2	3
Geography	2	-	-	-	-
Philosophy	-	-	2	3	3
Mathematics (included Computer Technology)	5	5	5	5	5
Physics	3	3	3	3	3
Natural sciences (Natural science, chemistry and astronomy)	-	2	3	3	2
Drawings and history of art	2	2	2	2	2
Physical education	2	2	2	2	2
Catholic religion or alternative activities	1	1	1	1	1
Total hours per week	29	30	31	31	32

==== Bilinguismo ====
Liceo scientifico (up to 2010) sperimentazione bilinguismo	Biennium		Triennium		
Liceo scientifico (up to 2010) sperimentazione bilinguismo	I	II	III	IV	V
Italian language and literature	4	4	4	3	4
Latin language and literature	4	5	4	4	3
Foreign language and literature	3	4	3	3	4
Second foreign language and literature	3	3	3	3	3
History	3	2	2	2	3
Geography	2	-	-	-	-
Philosophy	-	-	2	3	3
Mathematics	5	4	3	3	3
Physics	-	-	2	3	3
Natural sciences (Natural science, chemistry and astronomy)	-	2	3	3	2
Drawing and history of art	1	3	2	2	2
Physical education	2	2	2	2	2
Catholic religion or alternative activities	1	1	1	1	1
Total hours per week	28	30	31	32	33

==== Natural sciences ====
Liceo scientifico (up to 2010) sperimentazione scienze	Biennium		Triennium		
Liceo scientifico (up to 2010) sperimentazione scienze	I	II	III	IV	V
Italian language and literature	4	4	4	3	4
Latin language and literature	4	5	4	4	3
Foreign language and literature	3	4	3	3	4
History	3	2	2	2	3
Geography	2	-	-	-	-
Philosophy	-	-	2	3	3
Mathematics	5	4	3	3	3
Physics	-	-	2	3	3
Natural sciences (Natural science, chemistry and astronomy)	3	4	4	4	3
Drawing and history of art	2	2	2	2	2
Physical education	2	2	2	2	2
Catholic religion or alternative activities	1	1	1	1	1
Total hours per week	29	28	29	30	31

==== Brocca scientifica ====
The Liceo scientifico a indirizzo Brocca included, before the Gelmini reform, in addition of how included in the traditional Liceo scientifico, the law and economy subjects at the biennium, the laboratories of chemistry and physics, the computer technology included in the mathematics subjects for all the five years, and more hours of sciences (chemistry, biology, earth sciences). The various subjects in the five years of course are distributed as follows:

Progetto Brocca (1992-2010) Sperimentazione scientifica	Biennium		Triennium		
Progetto Brocca (1992-2010) Sperimentazione scientifica	I	II	III	IV	V
Italian language and literature	5	5	4	4	4
Latin language and literature	4	4	3	3	3
Foreign language and literature	3	3	3	3	3
History	2	2	2	2	2
Geography	2	2	-	-	-
Philosophy	-	-	2	3	3
Mathematics and Computer Technology	5	5	6	6	5
Laboratory of physics and chemistry	3	3	-	-	-
Earth sciences	3	-	-	-	2
Biology	-	3	3	2	2
Physics	-	-	4	3	3
Chemistry	-	-	2	3	2
History of art or music	2	2	2	2	2
Law and economy	2	2	-	-	-
Physical education	2	2	2	2	2
Catholic religion or alternative activities	1	1	1	1	1
Total hours per week	34	34	34	34	34

==== Brocca scientifico-tecnologica ====
This option was one of the seventeen lyceum courses developed by the Project Brocca. This course was characterized by the absence of Latin, by the addition of information technology, technology and drawing, and by the considerable number of hours for laboratorial work.

Progetto Brocca (1992-2010) Sperimentazione scientifico-tecnologica	Biennium		Triennium		
Progetto Brocca (1992-2010) Sperimentazione scientifico-tecnologica	I	II	III	IV	V
Italian language and literature	5	5	4	4	4
Foreign language and literature	3	3	3	3	3
History	2	2	2	2	3
Geography	3	-	-	-	-
Philosophy	-	-	2	3	3
Law and economy	2	2	-	-	-
Mathematics and Computer Technology	5	5	-	-	-
Mathematics	-	-	4	4	4
Computer Technology and informatic systems	-	-	3	3	3
Laboratory of physics and chemistry	5	5	-	-	-
Physics and laboratory	-	-	4	3	4
Chemistry and laboratory	-	-	3	3	3
Biology and laboratory	-	3	4	2	2
Earth sciences	3	-	-	2	2
Technology and drawing	3	6	-	-	-
Drawing	-	-	2	2	-
Physical education	2	2	2	2	2
Catholic religion or alternative activities	1	1	1	1	1
Total hours per week	34	34	34	34	34

== Gelmini reform (2010) and the current curriculum ==
The current course stems from the Gelmini reform and entered into force on 1 September 2010. Compared to the 1947 course of regulation, there is a significant increase in the number of hours devoted to scientific subjects and a lightening of Latin. At the time the reform came into force, all the experimentations activated were banned. However, a school autonomy is provided which allows each lyceum to redistribute up to 20% of the total hours between the various courses or to activate new ones. The reform has created a new curriculum, the applied sciences option, which gathers the experiences of the pre-existent Brocca scientifico-tecnologica and Brocca scientifico-biologica experimentations that, compared to the liceo scientifico basic curriculum, includes a reduction in the number of hours dedicated to humanistic subjects, the elimination of Latin, an increase in the hours of mathematics, physics and natural sciences and the addition of computer technology as a separated subject. For this reason the "liceo scientifico ad opzione delle scienze applicate" is present mainly at school facilities that already housed Technical Institutes, where laboratory practice is already consolidated.

The liceo scientifico mostly follows the liceo classico, adopting the same ministerial programs for teaching Italian, history and geography (for the biennium), and philosophy. For the rest, the course includes a reduction of the hours and programs concerning the Latin language and the history of the triennium to facilitate the in-depth study of scientific disciplines such as mathematics, physics, natural sciences and computing, the last only in the applied sciences option; there is also instruction of geometric and architectural drawing.

=== Traditional curriculum ===
Liceo scientifico (from 2010)	biennium		triennium		
Liceo scientifico (from 2010)	I	II	III	IV	V
Italian language and literature	4	4	4	4	4
Latin language and culture	3	3	3	3	3
Foreign language and culture	3	3	3	3	3
History and geography	3	3	-	-	-
History	-	-	2	2	2
Philosophy	-	-	3	3	3
Mathematics ^{1}	5	5	4	4	4
Physics	2	2	3	3	3
Natural science ^{2}	2	2	3	3	3
Drawing and history of art	2	2	2	2	2
Physical and sports sciences	2	2	2	2	2
Religion or alternative activities	1	1	1	1	1
Total hours per week	27	27	30	30	30

=== Applied sciences option ===
Liceo scientifico (from 2010) ad opzione delle scienze applicate	biennium		triennium		
Liceo scientifico (from 2010) ad opzione delle scienze applicate	I	II	III	IV	V
Italian language and literature	4	4	4	4	4
Foreign language and culture	3	3	3	3	3
History and geography	3	3	-	-	-
History	-	-	2	2	2
Philosophy	-	-	2	2	2
Mathematics	5	4	4	4	4
Computer Technology	2	2	2	2	2
Physics	2	2	3	3	3
Natural sciences ^{2}	3	4	5	5	5
Drawing and history of art	2	2	2	2	2
Physical and sports sciences	2	2	2	2	2
Religion or alternative activities	1	1	1	1	1
Total hours per week	27	27	30	30	30

- ^{1} with Computer Technology at the biennium
- ^{2} Biology, Chemistry, Earth sciences

It is included the teaching, in a foreign language (the language must be a co-official language of the European Union different from the main language of the curse), of a non-linguistic subject (due to CLIL European project) included in the area of activities and compulsory courses for all students or in the area of the teachings that can be activated by the educational institutions within the limits of the teaching staff annually assigned.

=== Sports curriculum ===
The first phase of changes to the order structure brought about by the Gelmini reform did not touch on some experimentations and addresses already activated, including the lyceums sports curricula. The revision of these guidelines was launched in 2008, and ended with the proposal in 2011 of a sports curriculum that can be activated at lyceum institutes.

The curriculum is an articulation of the liceo scientifico and issues a scientific baccalaureate curriculum sporting courses. Presents the study of a new subject: "Sports law and economics", there is an increase in the hours of physical and sports sciences and of the natural sciences, while the Latin language is absent (in some cases it is included for 3 hours a week among biennium and triennium) and the history of art, also, the hours devoted to philosophy have been reduced.

The first curse with sports curriculum was inaugurated in the school year 2012-2013 at the liceo scientifico of the Convitto Nazionale "Vittorio Emanuele II" of Rome, in collaboration with the "Giulio Onesti" Olympic Preparation Center of the CONI.

The study plan is as follows:

Liceo scientifico (from 2012) opzione sportiva	biennium		triennium		
Liceo scientifico (from 2012) opzione sportiva	I	II	III	IV	V
Italian language and literature	4	4	4	4	4
Foreign language and culture	3	3	3	3	3
History and geography	3	3	-	-	-
History	-	-	2	2	2
Philosophy	-	-	2	2	2
Mathematics ^{1}	5	5	4	4	4
Physics	2	2	3	3	3
Natural sciences ^{2}	3	3	3	3	3
Sports Law and economy	-	-	3	3	3
physical and sports sciences	3	3	3	3	3
Sport disciplines	3	3	2	2	2
Religion or alternative activities	1	1	1	1	1
Total hours per week	27	27	30	30	30

- ^{1} with Computer Technology at the biennium
- ^{2} Biology, Chemistry, Earth sciences

It is included the teaching, in a foreign language (the language must be a co-official language of the European Union different from the main language of the course), of a non-linguistic subject (due to CLIL European project) included in the area of activities and compulsory courses for all students or in the area of the teachings that can be activated by the educational institutions within the limits of the teaching staff annually assigned.

== Final exam ==
Like the other kinds of the Italian high secondary schools, liceo scientifico ends with a final examination graded on a 100-point scale. The exam consists of three different written tests and an oral test:

- prima prova ("first test"), an Italian language written test, same as in the other kinds of Italian high secondary school. In those parts of Italy where Italian is not the only official language, the first test can be alternatively held in the local co-official language (German in province of Bolzano, Slovenian in some areas of the province of Trieste and Ladin in some municipalities of the provinces of Trento and Bolzano);
- seconda prova ("second test"), a written test of mathematics or physics, decided at the national level for each curriculum. This test for the liceo scientifico consists of 2 problems and 10 questions. The examinees have to choose and solve 1 problem and 5 questions out of them, problems and questions vary among curricula;
- terza prova ("third test"), a multidisciplinary test decided by the exam committee. This exam contains questions about four subjects of the last year of the course, two subjects are nationally chosen, while the school decides on the other two. One of the four subjects must be a foreign language.

This test was removed in 2018, all subjects are now tested in the colloquio orale:

- colloquio orale ("oral interview"), an overall oral test (prova orale) on all the subjects of the last year. During the oral test, the exam committee assesses a presentation made by the examinee related to the last years arguments and as questions related to the presentation or to the previous tests (the minimum passing score for the oral test is 13 points).

Students are examined by an exam committee which is formed in equal parts by their own teachers and teachers coming from other schools. The first and second tests are written by the Ministry of Education, while the third test and the oral test are prepared and administered by the exam committee.

The total score is the sum of the pre-exam score, the written tests scores and the oral test score. To be admitted to the oral test, the student must get at least 30 total points in the first parts of the exam. If the total points exceed 100, the final score is rounded to 100, if the total points exceed 101, the final score becomes 100 con lode ("100 cum laude"). The passing grade for the final exam is 60.

The final exam is officially called esame di Stato ("state exam"), although the old name esame di maturità ("maturity exam") is still in common use.

== See also ==
- List of schools in Italy
- Liceo linguistico
- Liceo classico
