= Liceo linguistico =

Type of secondary school in Italy

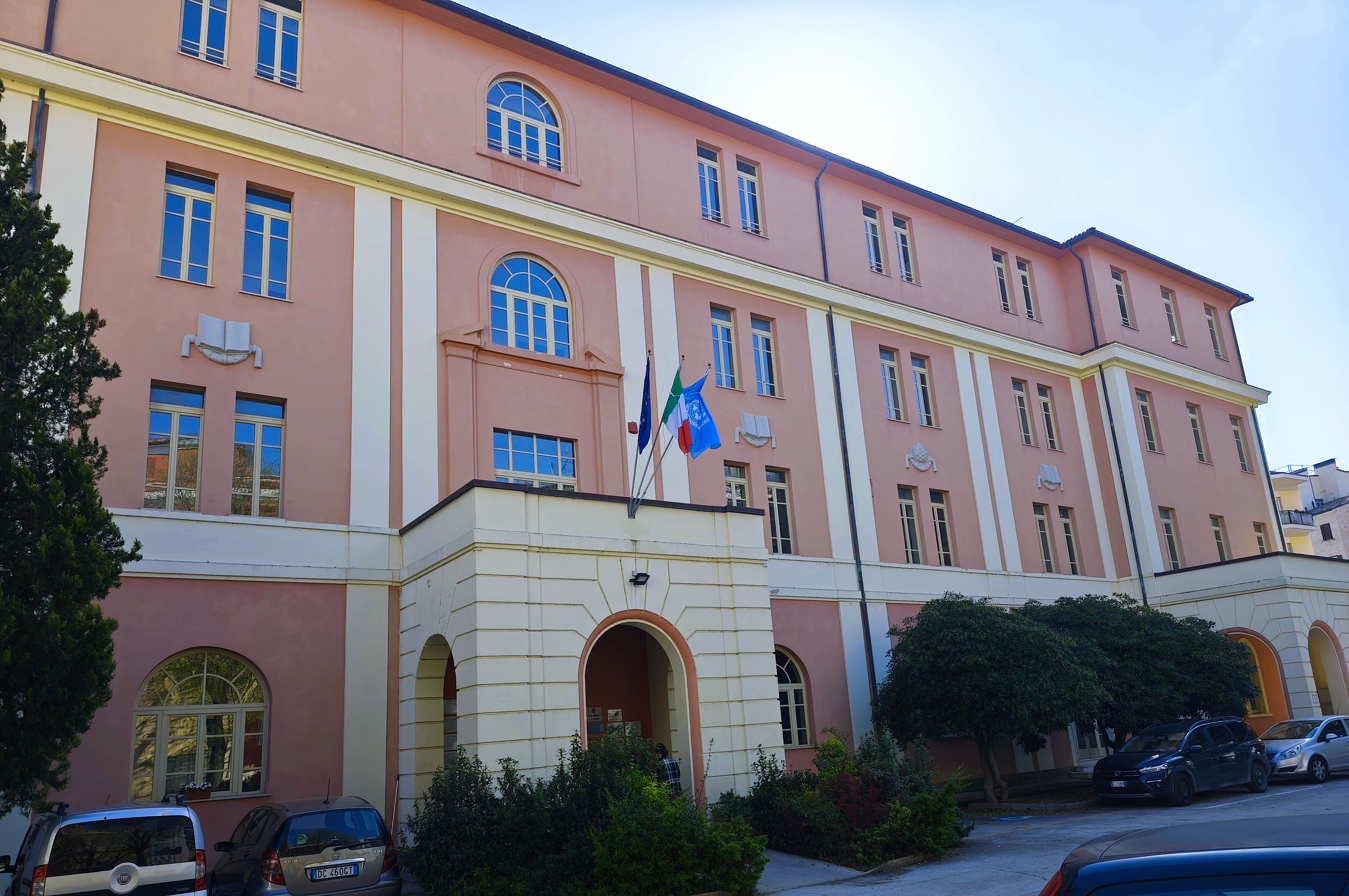
The Liceo Leopardi in Macerata

Liceo linguistico (Italian: [liˈtʃɛːo liŋˈɡwistiko]; lit. 'linguistic lyceum') is a type of secondary school in Italy. It is designed to give students the skills to progress to any university or higher educational institution. Students can attend the liceo linguistico after successfully completing middle school (scuola media).

The curriculum is devised by the Ministry of Education, and emphasises the link between multiculturalism and language learning. It covers a complete and widespread range of disciplines.

Students typically study for five years, and attend the school from the age of 14 to 19. At the end of the fifth year all students sit for the esame di Stato, a final examination which gives access to every university course.

A student attending a liceo is called "liceale", although the more generic terms studente (male) and studentessa (female) are also in common use. Teachers are known as professore (male) or professoressa (female).

== Subjects ==
During five years, students learn three foreign languages (including English) and acquire a rich humanistic and scientific culture.

At the end of the final year, the language proficiency of students is minimum B2.

This is the weekly schedule of liceo linguistico in 5 years:

Subject	Requirements
Italian language and literature	Four hours during 5 years
Latin language and literature	Two hours in the first and second year
English language and literature	Four hours in the first and second year, then three hours in the last three years
Second foreign language and literature	Three hours in the first and second year, then four hours in the last three years
Third foreign language and literature	Three hours in the first and second year, then four hours in the last three years
History and geography	Three hours in the first and second year
History	Two hours in the last three years
Philosophy	Two hours in the last three years
Mathematics and computer science	Three hours in the first and second year
Mathematics	Two hours in the last three years
Biology, chemistry and earth science	Two hours during 5 years
Physics	Two hours in the last three years
History of art	Two hours in the last three years
Physical education	Two hours during 5 years
Religious education or other activity	One hour during 5 years

== History ==
With the D.M. July 31, 1973, is launched as an experimentation in non-statal secondary education institutions. On 1 September 2010, with the Gelmini reform the experimental plans, the PNI and the Brocca project were blocked.

=== Linguistic Experimentation C.M. 27/91 ===
Subjects	Two-year period		Three-year period		
Subjects	I	II	III	IV	V
Italian language and Italian literature	4	4	4	4	4
History and Geography	3	3	-	-	-
History	-	-	2	2	3
Latin language and literature^{2}	3	3	3	3	2
First-language language and literature^{1}	3	3	4	4	4
Second-language language and literature^{1}	4	4	4	4	4
Third-language language and literature^{1}	-	-	5	5	5
Civical, juridical, and economical education	2	2	-	-	-
Philosophy	-	-	3	3	3
Mathematics and fundamentals of IT	4	4	3	3	3
Physics	3	3	-	-	-
Biology, chemistry, natural science	3	3	-	-	-
Science and geography	-	-	2	2	2
Drawing and artistic-visual languages	2	2	-	-	-
Artistic-visual languages and history of art	-	-	2	2	2
Physical education	2	2	2	2	2
Catholic religion or alternative activities	1	1	1	1	1
Total amount of weekly hours	35	35	35	35	35

- ^{1}33 hours per year were mandatorily done with a native speaker lecturer.
- ^{2}The written test of Latin language and literature was scheduled only for the two-year period.

=== Brocca project ===
The Brocca project was an experiment in which it was possible to enroll up to the 2009–2010 school year; in fact, starting from the 2010–2011 school year, the application of the new timetable frameworks began. The last students enrolled in the Brocca project graduated in the 2013–2014 school year.

Subjects	Two-year period		Three-year period		
Subjects	I	II	III	IV	V
Italian language and Italian literature	5	5	4	4	4
Latin language and literature	4	4	3	2	3
First-language language and literature ^{1}	3	3	3	3	3
Second-language language and literature ^{1}	4	4	3	3	3
Third-language language and literature ^{1}	-	-	5	5	4
History of art	2	2	2	2	2
History	2	2	3	3	3
Geography	2	2	-	-	-
Philosophy	-	-	2	3	3
Fundamentals of law and fundamentals of economics	2	2	-	-	-
Mathematics and IT	4	4	3	3	3
Natural science	3	-	-	-	-
Biology	-	3	-	-	2
Physics	-	-	-	4	2
Chemistry	-	-	4	-	-
Physical education	2	2	2	2	2
Catholic religion or alternative activities	1	1	1	1	1
Total amount of weekly hours	34	34	35	35	35

- ^{1} 33 hours per year were mandatorily done with a native speaker lecturer.

=== Gelmini reform ===
Starting from 1 September 2010, with the implementation of the Gelmini reform, all the high school language experiments and all the previously existing courses have been eliminated, creating a single address of homogeneous linguistic high school at national level. The ministerial offer that can be activated by individual schools, where possible, includes the teaching of the English language, French language, German language, Spanish language, Russian language, Arabic language, Hebrew language, Chinese language, and Japanese language.

==== Standard study plan ====
The study plan is as follows:

Subjects	1st two-year period		2nd two-year period		V
Subjects	I	II	III	IV	V
Italian language and Italian literature	4	4	4	4	4
Latin language	2	2	-	-	-
First-language language and literature ^{1}	4	4	3	3	3
Second-language language and literature ^{1}	3	3	4	4	4
Third-language language and literature ^{1}	3	3	4	4	4
History and Geography	3	3	-	-	-
History	-	-	2	2	2
Philosophy	-	-	2	2	2
Mathematics ^{2}	3	3	2	2	2
Physics	-	-	2	2	2
Science ^{3}	2	2	2	2	2
History of art	-	-	2	2	2
Physical Education	2	2	2	2	2
Catholic religion or alternative activities	1	1	1	1	1
Total amount of weekly hours	27	27	30	30	30

- ^{1} 33 hours per year are mandatorily done with a native speaker lecturer;
- ^{2} With IT during the 1st two-year period;
- ^{3} Fundamentals of Biology, chemistry, natural science.

==== EsaBac plan ====
Subjects	1st two-year period		2nd two-year period		V
Subjects	I	II	III	IV	V
Italian language and Italian literature	4	4	4	4	4
Latin language	2	2	-	-	-
First-language language and literature ^{1}	4	4	3	3	3
Second-language language and literature ^{1}	3	3	4	4	4
Third-language language and literature ^{1}	3	3	4	4	4
[History] and Geography	3	3	-	-	-
History	-	-	3	3	3
Philosophy	-	-	2	2	2
Mathematics ^{2}	3	3	2	2	2
Physics	-	-	2	2	2
Science ^{3}	2	2	2	2	2
History of art	-	-	2	2	2
Physical Education	2	2	2	2	2
Catholic religion or alternative activities	1	1	1	1	1
Total amount of weekly hours	27	27	31	31	31

- ^{1} 33 hours per year are mandatorily done with a native speaker lecturer;
- ^{2} With IT during the 1st two-year period;
- ^{3} Fundamentals of Biology, chemistry, natural science.

==== Gelmini reform dissatisfaction ====
After the reform, in 2010, for two years, Italian students starting to protest in the squares against the reform – according to them – completely not in line with a good educational path. The Gelmini reform not only deprived students of useful hours but also gave less hours per week to teach the same educational curriculum as pre-reform generating chaos among teachers and lectures. Researches, teachers, and students were – for the very first time – united against the reform on the Italian squares.

== Final exam ==
According to the law, students of the liceo linguistico must sit several written tests alongside a final interdisciplinary oral test. The first written exam is the Italian one, in which the student has to choose one text to analyse between three main categories: a poetic text, an argumentative essay or a contemporary essay. The second written test includes two texts in two languages (English obligatory + another language) to analyse and two essays to write. Finally, there is an oral exam, in which the candidate is tested in several subjects.

== EsaBac ==
If students study French language and literature in an EsaBac course, at the end of high school they must take a French history and French literature exam. Once passed, the students receive the esame di Stato (the final exam in Italy) and the Baccalauréat (the final exam in France). The language proficiency of students that attain that exam is minimum B2.

== University ==
After liceo linguistico, a student can enter any university faculty (from foreign languages to philosophy, mathematics, physics, medicine, chemistry, etc.). As well as in other licei in Italy, academic preparation is performed from the first to the last year.

== See also ==
- List of schools in Italy
- Liceo classico
- Liceo scientifico
