= Liceo classico =

Italian secondary school

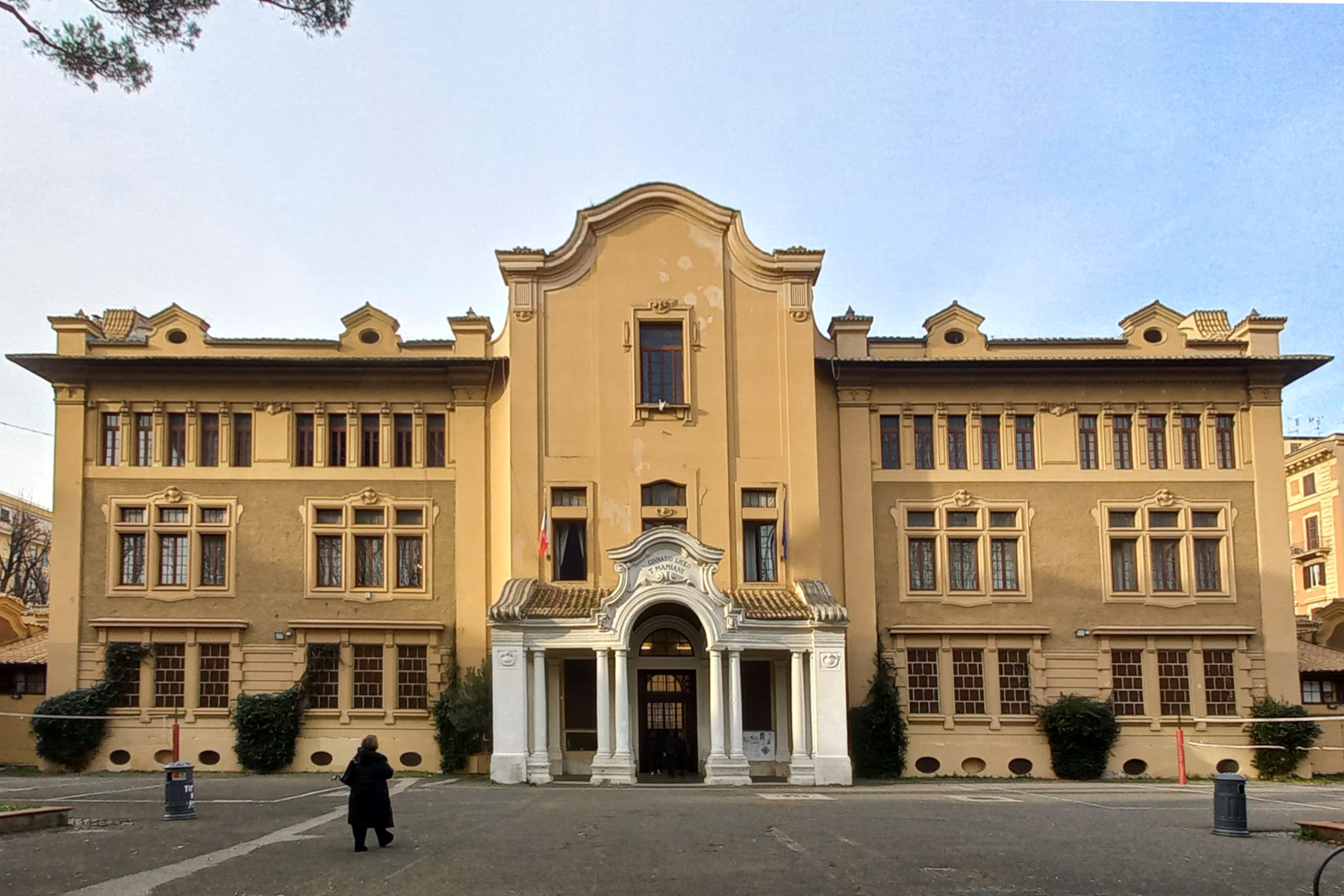
Liceo classico statale Terenzio Mamiani in Rome

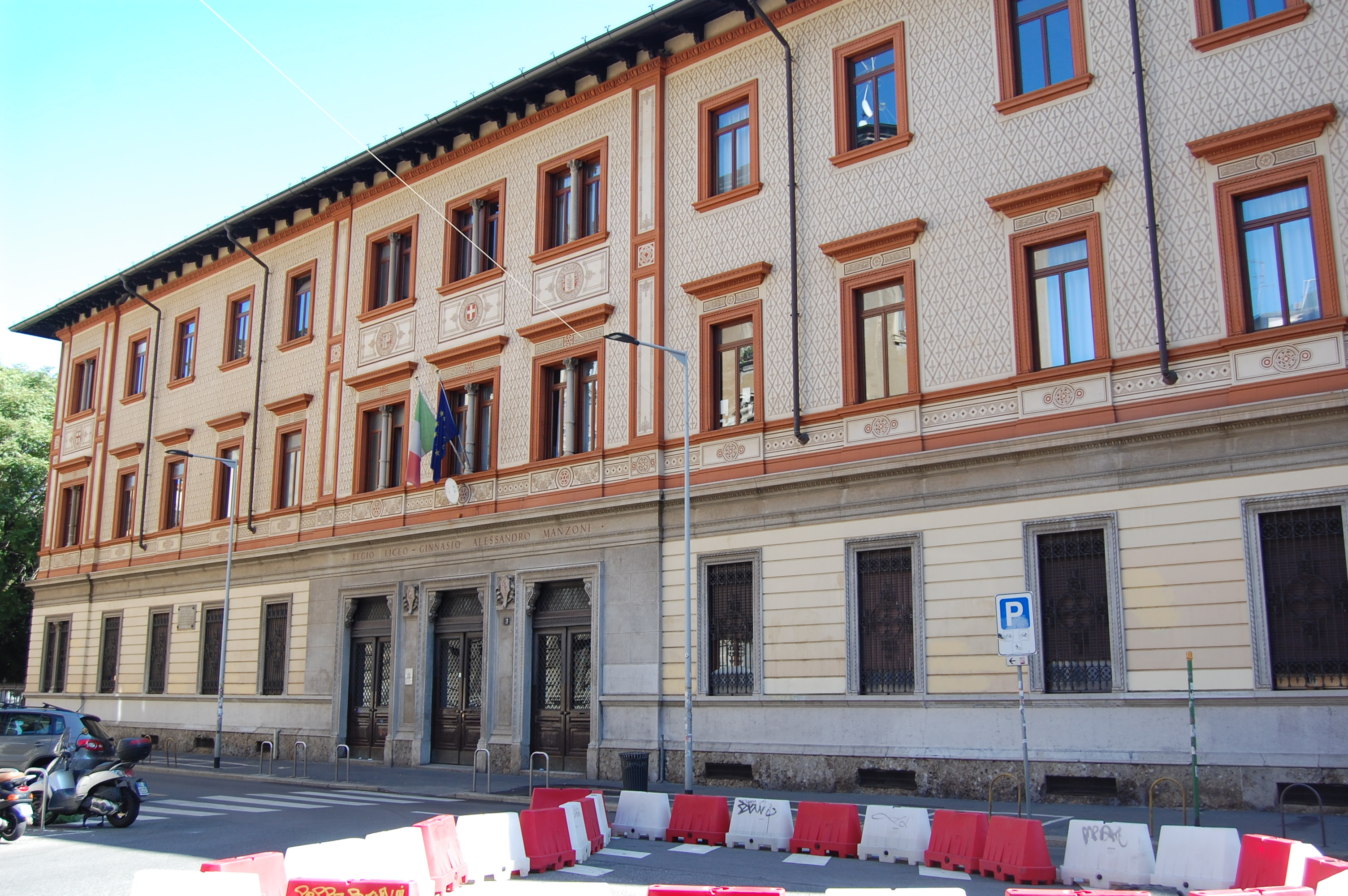
Liceo classico statale Alessandro Manzoni in Milan

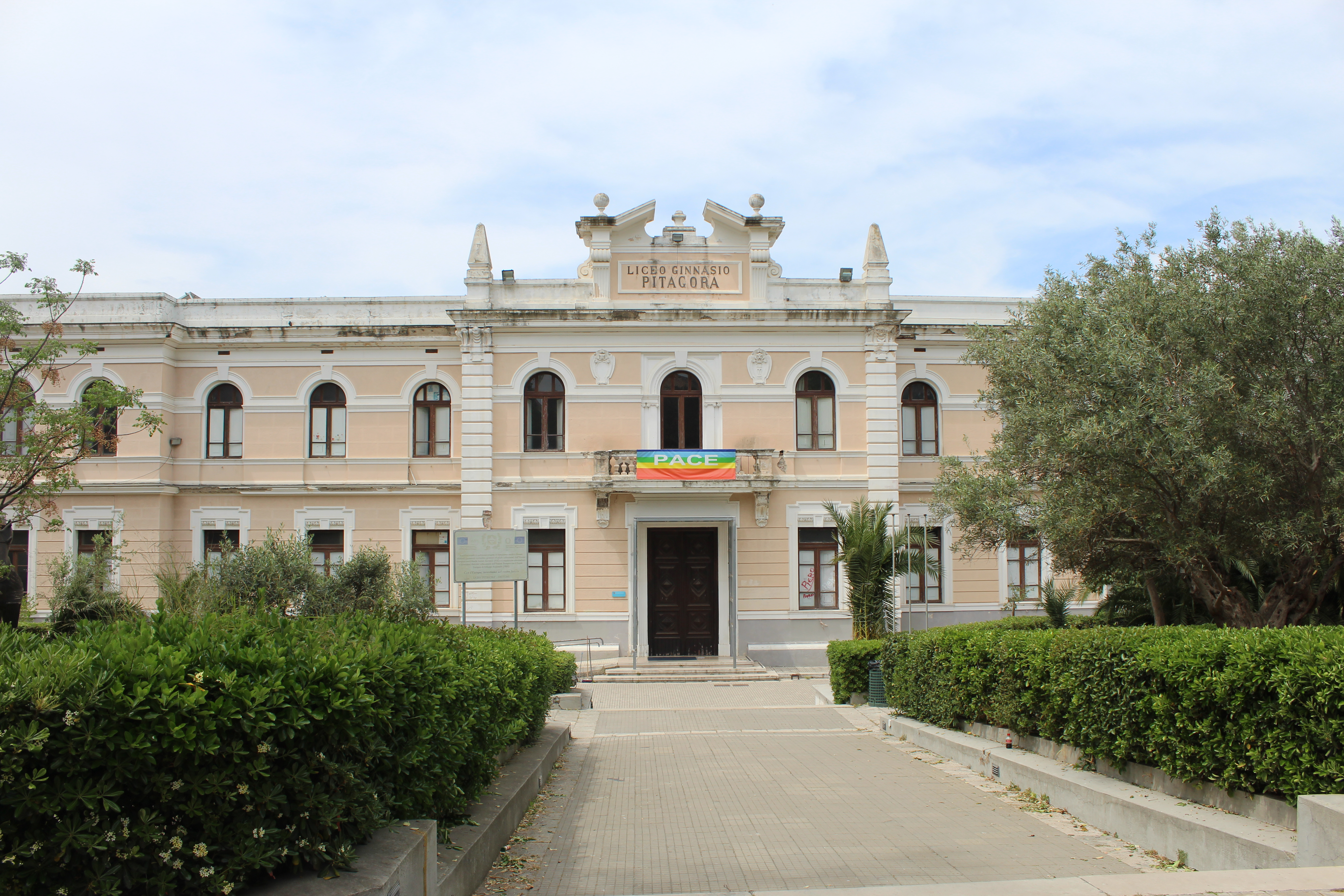
Liceo classico statale Pitagora in Crotone

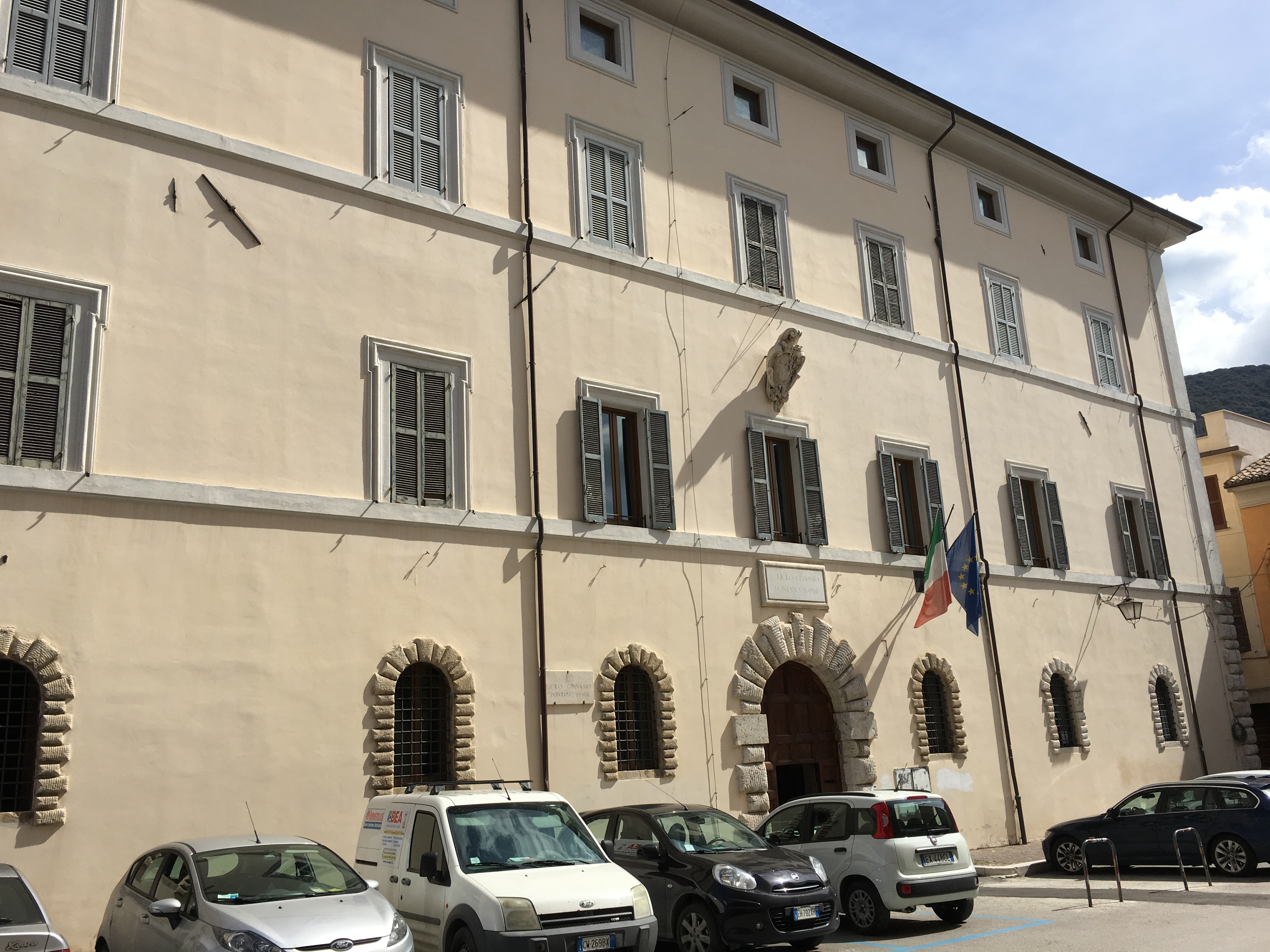
Liceo classico statale Pontano Sansi in Spoleto

The liceo classico or ginnasio (lit. 'classical lyceum') is the oldest public secondary school type in Italy. Its educational curriculum spans over five years, when students are generally about 14 to 19 years of age.

Until 1969, this was the only secondary school from which one could attend any kind of Italian university courses (including humanities and jurisprudence), thus being the school where the Italian elite were educated. It is known as a social scientific and humanistic school, one of the very few European secondary school types where the study of ancient languages (Latin and Ancient Greek) and their literature are compulsory. Most of the individuals who achieved the highest levels of leadership in the Italian government, science, diplomacy and business attended the Liceo Classico.

Liceo classico schools started in 1859, with the implementation of Gabrio Casati's reform.

The Gentile Reform implemented the so-called ginnasio, a five-years school comprising middle school (for students from 11 to 16), with a final test at the end of the second year of the secondary school. The test was written and oral, and it was compulsory in order to be admitted to the last three years of liceo. Currently liceo classico is similar to every other liceo in Italy, high school starts at 14 after middle school, without any additional exams.

Since the 1960s, all presbyters and bishops of the Catholic Church studied in seminaries and, since the 1990s, the topics taught inside those seminaries were the same as liceo classico (theoretical philosophy, Latin and Ancient Greek grammar and literature, English), with many others: ethics, psychology, pedagogy, sociology, Hebrew language, biblical criticism, Koine Greek (the Hellenistic period and Septuagint Bible), pastoral theology, Christian ethics and systematic theology, anthropology and eschatology, sacramentarian theology, Christology and Trinitarian theology, Mariology, patristics, ecclesiology, history of Christianity, history of religions, canon law, and liturgy.

== History ==
=== The liceo ginnasio ===
The liceo classico school type finds its roots in the so-called liceo ginnasio, established in 1859 with the Casati law, as a school following elementary school (compulsory), initially in force in the Kingdom of Sardinia and then extended to whole Italy after Italian Unification. High schools, however, already existed, having been established during the Napoleonic era, to ensure a high level of education to secular institutions as well.

On the model of the pre-unification humanist scholastic tradition, the Casati law provided for a single lyceum address in which the literary and humanistic subjects were prevalent. The original study plan foresaw an eight-year course (there was no middle school at the time), divided into five years of ginnasio and a three-year liceo ("lyceum"): the study of Latin began in the first gymnasium class, that of the (Ancient) Greek in the third.

The liceo ginnasio was an eight-year secondary school, since it also included middle school. It was accessed after primary school (initially a four-year school) and gave access to university degree courses of any kind; liceo ginnasio was the only secondary course of lyceum type, which was not aimed at technical-professional training, but at the continuation of studies in the university.

The study plan was directly related to the school tradition of the trivium and were therefore prevalent humanities so much that, in the early years of gymnasium, the only Italian and Latin covered three-quarters of the total hours of lessons. It should however be considered that at the time, the elementary school (four-year and municipal) was very different from the modern one and that, in fact, the first true schooling took place at the gymnasium.

The liceo ginnasio was meant to form the future elite of Italy; those who attended were supposed to continue with their studies, since it didn't provide a professional education.

Since its implementation, the school was criticized for its being focused on philosophical and humanistic topics and since it relegated scientific and technical education to a secondary role.

Timetable outline

| Gymnasium (1859) | I | II | III | IV | V |
|---|---|---|---|---|---|
| Italian | 7 | 7 | 6 | 4 | 4 |
| Latin | 8 | 8 | 9 | 6 | 6 |
| (Ancient) Greek | – | – | 2 | 4 | 4 |
| History, geography | 4 | 4 | 2 | 3 | 3 |
| Arithmetic | 1 | 1 | 1 | 3 | 3 |
| Gymnastics and military exercises | 4 | 4 | 4 | 2 | 2 |
| Religion | 1 | 1 | 1 | 1 | 1 |
| Total hours per week | 25 | 25 | 25 | 23 | 23 |

| Lyceum (1859) | I | II | III |
|---|---|---|---|
| Italian | 5 | 4 | 3 |
| Latin | 3 | 2 | 2 |
| (Ancient) Greek | 2 | 2 | 2 |
| History | 4 | 4 | 3 |
| Mathematics | 8 | – | 3 |
| Physics and chemistry | – | 6 | 3 |
| Philosophy | – | 4 | 4 |
| Natural history | – | – | 5 |
| Total hours by week | 22 | 22 | 25 |

=== Later changes ===
The gymnasium-lyceum outlined by the Casati law remained essentially unchanged until 1923, even if the schedules and timetable outlines were renewed several times (in 1867, 1884, 1888, 1892). The timetable outline of 1892 introduced the study of French from the third year of gymnasium to the fifth, filling the lack of a foreign language.

At the beginning of the 20th century, having emerged the problem of poor mathematical/scientific instruction, individual lyceums were allowed to activate experimental sections in which, instead of the Ancient Greek, mathematics or a modern language could be taught. In 1911 the liceo moderno and the first liceo scientifico were established, which joined the traditional course; to distinguish it from the latter, the traditional gymnasium-lyceum began to be called informally "liceo classico" ("classical lyceum"), even if, officially, the name remained "ginnasio liceo" ("gymnasium-lyceum").

The liceo moderno was abolished in 1923 with the Gentile Reform, which at the same time established a new liceo scientifico (in place of the previous one).

=== The Gentile reform ===
The Gentile Reform of 1923 kept the overall structure of the gymnasium/lyceum, emphasizing the humanistic-classicist aspect. This was in line with the principles of neo-idealist philosophy, of which Gentile was with Benedetto Croce, one of the greatest followers. In fact the neoidealist philosophers considered the literary, historical and digressive subjects the only ones able to provide real knowledge, especially philosophy, being in itself a literal, simple and primitive form of the abstract and natural sciences, and precisely for this reason indispensable for make them understandable.

In the Gentile's view, elite schools had to coincide with the liceo classico, intended for the education of future Italy's elites: only graduates from liceo classico were in fact granted enrollment in any university degree course, while for example those who came from liceo scientifico could not enroll neither in humanities, nor in law degree courses. This last obstacle was particularly serious, as law was a degree course of primary importance for Italy's elites.

Timetable outline

| Gymnasium (1923–1940) | I | II | III | IV | V |
|---|---|---|---|---|---|
| Italian | 7 | 7 | 7 | 5 | 5 |
| Latin | 8 | 7 | 7 | 6 | 6 |
| Ancient Greek | – | – | – | 4 | 4 |
| Foreign languages | – | 3 | 4 | 4 | 4 |
| History and geography | 5 | 5 | 4 | 3 | 3 |
| Mathematics | 1 | 2 | 2 | 2 | 2 |
| Total hours per week | 21 | 24 | 24 | 24 | 24 |

| Lyceum (1923–1940) | I | II | III |
|---|---|---|---|
| Italian letters | 4 | 4 | 3 |
| Latin literature | 4 | 4 | 3 |
| Ancient Greek literature | 4 | 4 | 3 |
| History | 3 | 3 | 3 |
| Philosophy | 3 | 3 | 3 |
| Mathematics | 3 | 2 | 3 |
| Physics | 1 | 2 | 2 |
| Natural sciences, chemistry and geography | 3 | 2 | 3 |
| History of art | – | 2 | 2 |
| Total hours per week | 25 | 26 | 25 |

=== The Bottai reform and the birth of the current liceo classico ===
Before 1940, post-elementary education was divided into several school types, each of which was preparatory for either lyceum or technical school). In that year the Bottai reform established the three-year middle school, which absorbed the first three years of gymnasium: since then, the liceo classico became structured as a five-year school, but it maintained the numbering of the previous classes (so the first two years became the fourth and fifth classes of ginnasio, the last three became the first, second and third classes of liceo: the numbering is typical of liceo classico schools, since other Italian secondary schools have a normal numbering).

Apart from a few timetable adjustments, such as the separation of history and geography into two separate subjects being taught in the fourth and fifth years of gymnasium, the new curriculum remained substantially identical to the previous one.

On this occasion, the official name was changed to "liceo classico"; the denomination of the years of study, however, remained as in the traditional one, still in force: after the third year of middle school, there are the fourth and fifth years of gymnasium and then the first, the second, and the third years of liceo classico. The Gentile reform allowed liceo classico students to access university degree courses of any kind.

Because of the war, the timetable was repeatedly remodeled until it became quite standard in 1952.

Outline of the timetable

| Liceo classico (1952–2010) | Gymnasium | | Lyceum | | |
| Liceo classico (1952–2010) | IV | V | I | II | III |
|---|---|---|---|---|---|
| Italian language and literature | 5 | 5 | 4 | 4 | 4 |
| Latin language and literature | 5 | 5 | 4 | 4 | 4 |
| (Ancient) Greek language and literature | 4 | 4 | 3 | 3 | 3 |
| Foreign language and literature | 4 | 4 | – | – | – |
| History | 2 | 2 | 3 | 3 | 3 |
| Geography | 2 | 2 | – | – | – |
| Philosophy | – | – | 3 | 3 | 3 |
| Mathematics | 2 | 2 | 3 | 2 | 2 |
| Physics | – | – | – | 2 | 3 |
| Natural sciences, chemistry and geography | – | – | 4 | 3 | 2 |
| History of art | – | – | 1 | 1 | 2 |
| Physical education | 2 | 2 | 2 | 2 | 2 |
| Catholic religion or alternate activities | 1 | 1 | 1 | 1 | 1 |
| Total hours per week | 27 | 27 | 28 | 28 | 29 |

=== Post-war and loss of the role of elite school ===
The number of liceo classico students started to decrease in favor of liceo scientifico schools, also because it was easier to access those schools with the reform of middle schools. When, in 1969, access to university was granted to students coming from any Italian secondary school, the number of students who enrolled in liceo classico schools further decreased; at the time of Gelmini reform (2010), students enrolled in the last year of liceo classico amounted to 51,000 students compared to 103,000 of the liceo scientifico.

=== From the 70s to the 2000s ===
As all other high schools, also the liceo classico, starting from 70's, enjoyed a certain degree of freedom that allowed to activate experimental curricula (sperimentazioni) together with the official regulation course provided by the Ministry, or even in place of this. The experimental curricula, once approved, could be freely adopted by the individual liceo classico schools.

The most widespread sperimentazione was going to fill what was perceived as the biggest gap in this school, namely the lack of foreign language education in the last three years; and indeed, this experimentation effectively replaced the course of regulation and was itself the basis for further sperimentazioni, such as sperimentazione storia dell'arte ("experimentation history of art") and sperimentazione P.N.I. ("National Plan of Computer studies" experimentation). At the time of Gelmini reform (2010), the overwhelming majority of students attended one of the below curricula:

- Liceo classico – sperimentazione della comunicazione ("classical lyceum – communication experimentation"): which included the study of the additional subject "Scienze della comunicazione" ("Communication Sciences"), and the program included an hour of law and economics from the fourth gymnasium, two more hours of mathematics and two hours of Earth science and biology. The Language of Communication can vary from computer science, movie, theater and dance.
- Liceo classico – sperimentazione PNI linguistico ("classical lyceum – P.N.I. linguistic experimentation"): provided for the usual strengthening of mathematics (4 hours at gymnasium, 3 hours at lyceum) and non-curricular teaching of a second foreign language (French, German, Spanish) for two hours per week for the first four years. The learning of the linguistic area, thus enhanced, is based on the comparative study of the common grammatical and semantic-lexical roots. The curriculum combines, therefore, the classical training, integrated with expansions in mathematical-informatic areas, with the requirements of European citizenship, expanding the curriculum with the teaching of a second community language.

==== Sperimentazione lingua straniera ====
| Liceo classico (up to 2010) sperimentazione lingua straniera | Gymnasium | | Lyceum | | |
| Liceo classico (up to 2010) sperimentazione lingua straniera | IV | V | I | II | III |
|---|---|---|---|---|---|
| Italian language and literature | 5 | 5 | 4 | 4 | 4 |
| Latin and literature | 5 | 5 | 4 | 4 | 4 |
| (Ancient) Greek and literature | 4 | 4 | 3 | 3 | 3 |
| Foreign language and literature | 3 | 3 | 3 | 3 | 3 |
| History | 2 | 2 | 3 | 3 | 3 |
| Geography | 2 | 2 | – | – | – |
| Philosophy | – | – | 3 | 3 | 3 |
| Mathematics | 2 | 2 | 3 | 2 | 2 |
| Physics | – | – | – | 2 | 3 |
| Natural sciences, chemistry and geography | – | – | 4 | 3 | 2 |
| History of art | – | – | 1 | 1 | 2 |
| Physical education | 2 | 2 | 2 | 2 | 2 |
| Catholic religion or alternate activities | 1 | 1 | 1 | 1 | 1 |
| Total hours per week | 26 | 26 | 31 | 31 | 32 |

==== Sperimentazione lingua e arte ====
| Liceo classico (up to 2010) sperimentazione lingua e arte | Gymnasium | | Lyceum | | |
| Liceo classico (up to 2010) sperimentazione lingua e arte | IV | V | I | II | III |
|---|---|---|---|---|---|
| Italian language and literature | 5 | 5 | 4 | 4 | 4 |
| Latin and literature | 5 | 5 | 4 | 4 | 4 |
| (Ancient) Greek and literature | 4 | 4 | 3 | 3 | 3 |
| Foreign languages: grammar and literature | 3 | 3 | 3 | 3 | 3 |
| History | 2 | 2 | 3 | 3 | 3 |
| Geography | 2 | 2 | – | – | – |
| Philosophy | – | – | 3 | 3 | 3 |
| Mathematics | 2 | 2 | 3 | 2 | 2 |
| Physics | – | – | – | 2 | 3 |
| Natural sciences, chemistry and geography | – | – | 4 | 3 | 2 |
| History of art | 2 | 2 | 2 | 2 | 2 |
| Physical education | 2 | 2 | 2 | 2 | 2 |
| Catholic religion or alternate activities | 1 | 1 | 1 | 1 | 1 |
| Total hours per week | 28 | 28 | 32 | 32 | 32 |

==== Sperimentazione lingua e PNI ====
| Liceo classico (up to 2010) sperimentazione lingua e P.N.I. | Gymnasium | | Lyceum | | |
| Liceo classico (up to 2010) sperimentazione lingua e P.N.I. | IV | V | I | II | III |
|---|---|---|---|---|---|
| Italian language and literature | 5 | 5 | 4 | 4 | 4 |
| Latin and literature | 5 | 5 | 4 | 4 | 4 |
| (Ancient) Greek and literature | 4 | 4 | 3 | 3 | 3 |
| Foreign language: grammar and literature | 3 | 3 | 3 | 3 | 3 |
| History | 2 | 2 | 3 | 3 | 3 |
| Geography | 2 | 2 | – | – | – |
| Philosophy | – | – | 3 | 3 | 3 |
| Mathematics (including computer science) | 4 | 4 | 3 | 3 | 3 |
| Physics | – | – | – | 2 | 3 |
| Natural sciences, chemistry and geography | – | – | 4 | 3 | 2 |
| History of art | – | – | 1 | 1 | 2 |
| Physical education | 2 | 2 | 2 | 2 | 2 |
| Catholic religion or alternate activities | 1 | 1 | 1 | 1 | 1 |
| Total hours per week | 28 | 28 | 31 | 32 | 33 |

==== Sperimentazione bilinguismo ====
| Liceo classico (up to 2010) sperimentazione bilinguismo | Gymnasium | | Lyceum | | |
| Liceo classico (up to 2010) sperimentazione bilinguismo | IV | V | I | II | III |
|---|---|---|---|---|---|
| Italian language and letters | 5 | 5 | 4 | 4 | 4 |
| Latin and letters | 5 | 5 | 4 | 4 | 4 |
| (Ancient) Greek and letters | 4 | 4 | 3 | 3 | 3 |
| Foreign language and literature 1 | 3 | 3 | 3 | 3 | 3 |
| Foreign language and literature 2 | 3 | 3 | 3 | 3 | 3 |
| History | 2 | 2 | 3 | 3 | 3 |
| Geography | 2 | 2 | – | – | – |
| Philosophy | – | – | 3 | 3 | 3 |
| Mathematics | 2 | 2 | 3 | 2 | 2 |
| Physics | – | – | – | 2 | 3 |
| Natural sciences, chemistry and geography | – | – | 4 | 3 | 2 |
| History of art | – | – | 1 | 1 | 2 |
| Physical education | 2 | 2 | 2 | 2 | 2 |
| Catholic religion or alternate activities | 1 | 1 | 1 | 1 | 1 |
| Total hours per week | 29 | 29 | 34 | 34 | 35 |

==== Sperimentazione Brocca ====
The liceo classico sperimentazione progetto Brocca ("classical lyceum – Project Brocca experimentation") envisaged, more than the traditional curriculum, the inclusion in the biennium of the subjects law and economy, laboratory of chemistry and physics, Computer Technology combined with mathematics for the entire five-year period, and an increase in science hours (chemistry, biology, Earth sciences). The experimentation was abolished with the entry into force of the Gelmini reform.

| Liceo classico (up to 2010) sperimentazione progetto Brocca | Gymnasium | | Lyceum | | |
| Liceo classico (up to 2010) sperimentazione progetto Brocca | IV | V | I | II | III |
|---|---|---|---|---|---|
| Italian language and literature | 5 | 5 | 4 | 4 | 4 |
| Latin and literature | 4 | 4 | 4 | 4 | 4 |
| (Ancient) Greek and literature | 4 | 4 | 3 | 3 | 3 |
| Foreign language and literature | 3 | 3 | 3 | 3 | 3 |
| History | 2 | 2 | 3 | 3 | 3 |
| Geography | 2 | 2 | – | – | – |
| Philosophy | – | – | 3 | 3 | 3 |
| Mathematics and Computer Technology | 4 | 4 | 3 | 3 | 3 |
| Physics | – | – | – | 4 | 2 |
| Earth sciences | 3 | – | – | – | – |
| Biology | – | 3 | – | – | 2 |
| Chemistry | – | – | 4 | – | – |
| History of art and/or music education | 2 | 2 | – | – | – |
| History of art | – | – | 2 | 2 | 2 |
| Law and economy | 2 | 2 | – | – | – |
| Law | – | – | 2 | 2 | – |
| Economy | – | – | – | – | 2 |
| Physical education | 2 | 2 | 2 | 2 | 2 |
| Catholic religion or alternate activities | 1 | 1 | 1 | 1 | 1 |
| Total hours per week | 34 | 34 | 34 | 34 | 34 |

==== Sperimentazione classico europeo ====
The experimentation started with the principles of the Maastricht Treaty, where the European dimension of teaching is linked to the learning and dissemination of the languages of the Member States and the knowledge of the culture and history of the European peoples. In this way the liceo classico europeo (literally "European classical lyceum") has been assigned the aim of favoring the formation of a European conscience, as a function of an ever greater strengthening of the European Union.

The liceo classico europeo was conceived starting from the programs of the traditional liceo classico curriculum, on which have been grafted peculiar or innovative features, such as, in particular, the five-year study of two foreign languages (the English language and a second Community language among French, German and Spanish), the study of law and of political economy, the study of two non-linguistic curricular subjects taught in a foreign Community language among history, history of art, science, geography (also called geo-history), and law and political economy, the merging of the (Ancient) Greek and Latin into a single subject (classical languages and literatures) with a comparative approach; moreover, the hours of mathematics are increased up to a total equal to that of the liceo scientifico.

=== 2000s ===
In 2008 there were about 280,000 students signed in the liceo classico (of which 70 percent were girls), placing this schooling curricula in fourth place (after liceo scientifico curricula, and technical and professional institutes).

=== Moratti reform ===
In secondary school there is a first two-year period and a second two-year period to which a further year is added. It is also possible to change majors without having to lose the years already passed and by just doing a small supplementary exam of the different subjects among the other majors (basic subjects such as: mathematics-history etc. go through the same stages for all majors).

In all high schools the teaching of philosophy and the second community language was foreseen. In the articles 2 and 4 introduces school-work alternation, the discipline of which was dictated by Legislative Decree no. 15 April 2005. 77, although not mandatory.

=== Gelmini reform ===
With the Gelmini reform of 2010 the previous traditional liceo classico curriculum, the experimentations and the assisted projects all merged into the new liceo classico curriculum, in force since 1 September 2010. The current course does not differ markedly from the previous one, established in 1952, but it contains a few minor improvements. The liceo classico has the following timetable:

| Liceo classico (from 2010) | biennium | | triennium | | |
| Liceo classico (from 2010) | I | II | III | IV | V |
|---|---|---|---|---|---|
| Italian language and literature | 4 | 4 | 4 | 4 | 4 |
| Latin language and literature, literature is taught from the third year | 5 | 5 | 4 | 4 | 4 |
| (Ancient) Greek and literature, literature is taught from the third year | 4 | 4 | 3 | 3 | 3 |
| Foreign language and culture | 3 | 3 | 3 | 3 | 3 |
| History (from the beginnings to the Middle Age) and geography | 3 | 3 | – | – | – |
| History, from the Middle Age to Current affairs | – | – | 3 | 3 | 3 |
| Philosophy | – | – | 3 | 3 | 3 |
| Mathematics ^{1} | 3 | 3 | 2 | 2 | 2 |
| Physics | – | – | 2 | 2 | 2 |
| Natural sciences ^{2} | 2 | 2 | 2 | 2 | 2 |
| History of art | – | – | 2 | 2 | 2 |
| Physical and sport sciences | 2 | 2 | 2 | 2 | 2 |
| Religions or alternate activities | 1 | 1 | 1 | 1 | 1 |
| Total hours per week | 27 | 27 | 31 | 31 | 31 |

- ^{1} With computer science in the first two years
- ^{2} biology, chemistry, earth science

The main subjects are humanities and literature. Regarding the subjects in common with all the lyceums, it is worth mentioning a considerable number of hours are also devoted to the study of history and philosophy.

The main subjects are Latin and Ancient Greek. Latin is also taught in the first two academic years of the liceo linguistico and in the traditional curricula of the liceo scientifico and liceo delle scienze umane, while Ancient Greek is taught only in liceo classico schools. In the first two years (ginnasio), liceo classico provides a thorough education on the grammar, syntax and morphology of Latin and Ancient Greek, while, in the last three years, courses are focused on Ancient Greek and Latin literature.

Geography, which is taught ginnasio together with history, is stopped in the last three years in favor of philosophy, physics and history of art. The program of natural sciences includes the study of chemistry and astronomy in the first year, biology and chemistry in the subsequent three years and geology and chemistry in the last year.

The Italian law DPR 15 marzo 2010, n. 89 provided, in annex C the new liceo classico timetable outline. The decree n. 89/2010 is part of the so-called Gelmini reform, which revised the structure of higher secondary schools.

In 2012 there were 6.66% of students enrolled in liceo classico schools all over Italy: for the first time, students who enrolled in the first year of liceo classico were less than those who chose liceo linguistico schools, which amounted to 7.25%. In 2016, the students of liceo delle scienze umane schools were 7.4% of total students, while those of liceo classico were 6.2%, making liceo classico the fourth liceo school by number of students.

== Subjects ==
A liceo classico school offers a wide selection of subjects, but the central subjects are those related to literature. Several hours are also dedicated to the study of history and philosophy.

The liceo classico's distinctive subjects are history, Latin and Ancient Greek. In Italy, Latin is taught in other kinds of schools as well, like liceo scientifico, liceo delle scienze umane and few others with linguistic specializations. However, Ancient Greek is taught only in the liceo classico.

Another peculiarity of the liceo classico is what the academic years are called: in all the other Italian five-year secondary schools, academic years are referred to with increasing numbers starting from 1 to 5. In liceo classico the first two years are called ginnasio; the name comes from the Greek gymnasion (training ground). The first year is called "4th year of ginnasio", and the second year is referred to as "5th year of ginnasio" because, until the reform of 1962, this course of study started just after a three-year middle school ("scuola media inferiore"). By 1963, the first three years were suppressed and integrated in the 'unified secondary school', where Latin was mandatory as a subject to access the high schools until 1975. The remaining three years of liceo classico are referred as "1st, 2nd and 3rd year of liceo". However, nowadays this habit is waning, even though the names of the different years are still colloquially used.

This naming system comes from the Gentile Reform of the fascist regime, named after Giovanni Gentile, an Italian philosopher and politician, who had planned an eight-year school career (five years of ginnasio and three of liceo) that could be accessed by passing a test after the fifth year of elementary school. There was also another test between the ginnasio and the liceo. Several reforms changed the Italian school system in about 1940 and 1960; the first three years of ginnasio were separated and became an independent kind of school. In 1968, the compulsory test which had to be taken at the end of the ginnasio to enter the liceo was abolished, so the liceo classico got the structure it has today.

In 2010, the Gelmini Reform changed the traditional Italian school system, so now students follow a specific pattern of courses that covers a wide range of disciplines, even if they were still, for the most part, focused on humanities:

- Italian grammar and literature (all five years)
- History (all five years)
- Latin language, grammar (the two years of ginnasio) and literature (the three years of liceo)
- Ancient Greek language, grammar (the two years of ginnasio) and literature (the three years of liceo)
- Mathematics (all five years)
- History of Art (three years, during the liceo; still, some high schools offer a five-year, in-depth history of art program)
- Philosophy (the three years of liceo)
- Physics (the three years of liceo)
- Biology, chemistry and natural science (all five years)
- English grammar (all five years) and literature (the three years of liceo)
- Catholic religion instruction (optional)
- Physical education (all five years)
- Geography (two years, during the ginnasio, integrating with the History course)

However, nowadays it is common to find licei offering (together with this programme of studies) courses in music theory and history of music or an in-depth course in science or maths, for one or two hours a week every year.

At the end, students must pass the Esame di Stato (until 1999 denominated Esame di maturità) to obtain their certificate.

| Subjects | 1º Biennial | | 2º Biennial | | V year |
| Subjects | I year | II year | III year | IV year | V year |
|---|---|---|---|---|---|
| Italian language and literature | 4 | 4 | 4 | 4 | 4 |
| Latin | 5 | 5 | 4 | 4 | 4 |
| Ancient Greek | 4 | 4 | 3 | 3 | 3 |
| English | 3 | 3 | 3 | 3 | 3 |
| History and geography | 3 | 3 | – | – | – |
| History | – | – | 3 | 3 | 3 |
| Philosophy | – | – | 3 | 3 | 3 |
| Mathematics* | 3 | 3 | 2 | 2 | 2 |
| Physics | – | – | 2 | 2 | 2 |
| Natural science** | 2 | 2 | 2 | 2 | 2 |
| History of art | – | – | 2 | 2 | 2 |
| Physical education | 2 | 2 | 2 | 2 | 2 |
| Catholic religion instruction or other activities | 1 | 1 | 1 | 1 | 1 |
| Weekly lesson hours | 27 | 27 | 31 | 31 | 31 |

- *with computer lab at first biennial
- **Biology, chemistry and earth science

== Debate on the study of Latin and Ancient Greek ==
Unlike what is commonly believed, the debate on whether or not to abolish the study of Latin and Ancient Greek is not recent. Among others, academic Federico Condello and Italian newspaper Il Sole 24 Ore examined its development over history. Thomas Jefferson, as early as 1782, pointed out that "Ancient Greek and Latin are nowadays less and less taught in Europe."

In the Kingdom of Italy, in the report "On the conditions of public education in the Kingdom of Italy" (1865), it was stated that "Latin is neither studied nor loved by young people and, regarding the knowledge of Latin, there has been a considerable regress in the past twenty-five years. "

In the twentieth century, the left-wing thinkers started to moderately criticize classical studies. On 17 September 1906, Ernesto Cesare Longobardi wrote on newspaper L'Avanti that "Italy needs more traders and technicians than commentators of classics "; but he also affirmed that completely abandoning the study of Latin wouldn't be a good thing.

In the second half of the twentieth century left-wing thinkers managed to standardize and modernize education in a certain sense, eliminating the bourgeois obstacles of education. Thanks to these reforms, Latin disappeared from middle school curricula, and it became possible to be enrolled to university for all students from any Italian high school, but the teaching of Latin and Ancient Greek remained a compulsory part of the curriculum of Liceo classico.

The academic and writer Federico Condello, in his book La scuola giusta. In difesa del liceo classico (2018), also examines the positions of a controversial figure such as Adolf Hitler quoting a phrase from Mein Kampf, in which it is written that "[education] has to correspond more to the classic subjects,... Otherwise, one renounces forces which are still more important for the preservation of the nation than any technical or other ability. Classical studies don't have to be abandoned. The Hellenic ideal of culture, too, should be preserved for us in its exemplary beauty."

== Debate on liceo classico ==
In recent years, the real usefulness of liceo classico has also been questioned, with criticism and defenses coming from many parts. In general, the debate has developed both in the broader context of the need to reform the entire education system of Italy, adapting it to the cultural and working needs of the contemporary world.

=== Translation from ancient languages ===
Liceo classico is supposed to teach the students, among other things, a more rigorous way of translating a text. It is taught that the nuances of meaning can make the difference and that, in order to be able to translate correctly, it is necessary to understand and explain with simple words the meaning of each word. The translation of the so-called "versions" (Italian: versioni) of text in Latin and Ancient Greek has been compared by physicist Guido Tonelli to "scientific research" and it's supposed to be a useful mental exercise.

Moreover, Latin and Ancient Greek may also make the students more interested in archeology, philology, linguistics and the deciphering of ancient languages. When students of liceo classico are abroad and learn a new language, some of them are supposed to follow a more rigorous and perhaps more profitable approach than other students, for example by buying a good dictionary and deepening the study of grammar.

In Italy, Latin and Ancient Greek are said to be highly educational; these disciplines, as well as liceo classico itself are supposed to make the students more skilled according to many Italians, even though there is no conclusive statistical evidence that shows this. According to the critics, the study of Latin and Ancient Greek would not provide a better education in all fields, but only in the field of humanities, i.e. literature linguistics, history, philosophy, philology, archeology, art history and therefore it is more suitable for students with a primary interest in these disciplines.

Some Italian newspapers also praised Mark Zuckerberg and Bill Gates because they had studied Latin and Ancient Greek at high school, and some newspapers even claimed that this was the key to their success and that without the knowledge of these disciplines they would have been "underpaid employees". Other sources, however, pointed out that in particular Mark Zuckerberg was already very clever on his own, he had studied in elite institutions, he also knew Hebrew and other ancient and modern languages, and he had knowledge in various fields. Moreover, it is unclear how many hours Zuckerberg and Gates have actually dedicated to these subjects, perhaps only a small part compared to the efforts needed by the Italian school system. Last but not least, other successful entrepreneurs, such as Steve Jobs, did not know Latin and Ancient Greek.

The Italian academic Massimo Fusillo, professor of literary criticism and comparative literature at the University of L'Aquila, for a brief part of his life was also a classicist and argued that the previous students of liceo classico who enroll in classics university courses "basically start from the beginning". In addition, in the United States students begin to study Latin and Ancient Greek in universities without having knowledge at all of these languages and, despite this, American universities always provided highly skilled classicists. Fusillo also stated that, during his teaching experience at university, he rarely found "differences between students coming from the liceo classico and liceo scientifico".

=== Elitism and backwardness ===
Among the points in favor of liceo classico is certainly its being an elitist school, since it allows the cleverest and most ambitious students to follow a common study path compared to a mixed class, and this may result in a better education. This, however, is generally valid for most elite schools, regardless of whether Latin or Ancient Greek are taught.

The statistical data that seem to prove that liceo classico provides a better education (for example, students who studied at liceo classico graduate at university with higher scores compared to students who studied in other schools), are correct, but not sufficient to establish an indisputable primacy of liceo classico on other high schools. Since liceo classico still has the fame of being an elite school, Italian students who choose liceo classico are more "serious", prepared, more motivated by their parents than students who enroll in other high schools and their average scores are higher since the middle school. Therefore, from a statistical point of view, it's not correct to draw conclusions from the graduation grades of students coming from different schools, since there has been a sort of upstream "selection" and the sample of students of liceo classico is, in statistical terms, "not representative of the population". In addition, students who are rejected by liceo classico often enroll in other high schools or technical schools – often the private ones – and a certain percentage manage to graduate, while it's very unlikely that a student rejected from liceo scientifico or a technical institute enroll in liceo classico and manages to graduate there.

== See also ==
- List of schools in Italy
- Lyceum (classical)
- Liceo linguistico, language lyceum
- Liceo scientifico, scientific lyceum
- Gymnasium (Germany)
