= Liceo moderno =

Type of Italian lyceum

The ginnasio liceo moderno (or simply liceo moderno) (lit. 'gymnasium modern lyceum') was a high school of the Kingdom of Italy, established in 1911 on the initiative of the Minister of Public Education Luigi Credaro (law 860/1911), who partially accepted the proposal of the Real commission, a parliamentary commission established in 1906 in order to enrich the Italian lyceum offer.

== History ==
The liceo moderno was the first attempt to upgrade the Italian lyceum system, dating back to the Casati law of 1859. Before it, in fact, there were some experimental sections without Greek and with mathematics or foreign languages, but they were dependent on individual schools and therefore they were not regulated by a ministerial directive. It did not have time to actually affirm itself because it was established over the years at the turn of the First World War and because the advent of Fascism brought a radical new reform of the entire school system. It was activated only in eight provinces and never in a proper school structure; that is, no autonomous modern lyceums were activated, as will happen later with scientific lyceums, rather where activated sections of ginnasio liceo moderno within school structures in which were yet existing sections of ginnasio liceo (classico). The denomination of the scholastic years remained the traditional one, with a lower three-year gymnasium (the same for both high schools), two high two-years gymnasiums (classico and moderno) and two more three-years lyceums (classico and moderno). Contrary to what was originally proposed, it allowed access to any university faculty, including letters and philosophy. The liceo moderno was suppressed by the Gentile Reform of 1923, which also suppressed the physical-mathematical section of the Regio Istituto Tecnico (Royal Technical Institute) and replaced the liceo scientifico instituted also by the Credaro law of 1911 with that still existing.

=== The proposal of the Royal Commission ===
The Royal Commission was established in 1906 and, after three years, presented a reform plan which included, moreover:

- a three-year gymnasium, only one without Latin;
- three five-years lyceums:

- the liceo classico ("classical lyceum"), which was based on the then existing liceo classico – established by the Casati law – and was characterized by the teaching of classical languages (Ancient Greek and Latin, from which is based the Italian language); allowed access to any university faculty;
- the liceo moderno ("modern lyceum"), without Greek, with the strengthening of the foreign language (French), with the teaching of a second foreign language (German or English), of the law and the economy; it did not allow access to the Faculty of Letters;
- the liceo scientifico ("scientific lyceum"), without classical languages, with the teaching of a second foreign language and a strengthening of scientific subjects; it did not allow access to the Faculties of Letters and Jurisprudence.

The name of the school years varied with respect of the one then in force (and still in force for the liceo classico) since after the third year of gymnasium, the first years of liceo (classico, moderno or scientifico depending on the choice) and continued until the fifth year. This denomination was resumed in 1923 (and still in force) for the liceo scientifico. In accordance with the Italian tradition, at the three proposed lyceums were not recognized equal dignity as access to some university faculties was conditioned by the address of attended liceo. If the liceo moderno did not allow only access to the Letters and philosophy faculty, the liceo scientifico did not allow access also to Jurisprudence faculty; and was this last a heavy limitation in that, traditionally, the faculty of Jurisprudence was the most frequented by the management classes. This limitation was resumed in 1923, when was established the current liceo scientifico, whose title, until 1969, was not valid for signing into Letters faculty (the signing in Jurisprudence was instead permitted by the law 1859 of 31 December 1962). The liceo classico, instead, allowed access to any university faculty.

Disciplines	Classico						Moderno						Scientifico					
Disciplines	I	II	III	IV	V	TOT	I	II	III	IV	V	TOT	I	II	III	IV	V	TOT
Italian	5	4	4	4	4	21	5	4	4	4	4	21	5	4	4	4	4	21
Latin	8	6	6	6	6	32	6	5	4	4	3	22	-	-	-	-	-	0
(Ancient) Greek	-	5	5	5	5	20	-	-	-	-	-	0	-	-	-	-	-	0
French	3	2	-	-	-	5	4	2	2	2	2	12	3	2	-	-	-	5
English or German	-	-	-	-	-	0	-	5	4	3	3	15	3	3	3	3	3	15
History	3	3	3	3	3	15	3	3	3	3	3	15	3	3	3	3	3	15
Geography	2	2	2	-	-	6	2	2	2	2	-	8	2	2	2	2	2	10
Philosophy	-	-	3	2	3	8	-	-	3	2	3	8	-	-	3	2	3	8
Mathematics	2	2	2	2	2	10	2	2	2	2	2	10	5	5	5	5	5	25
Physics	-	-	-	3	2	5	-	-	-	3	3	6	-	-	3	3	3	9
Chemistry	-	-	2	-	-	2	-	-	2	-	-	2	3	3	-	-	-	6
Natural history	2	2	-	-	2	6	2	2	-	-	2	6	2	2	2	2	2	10
Law and political economy	-	-	-	-	-	0	-	-	-	3	3	6	-	-	-	-	-	0
Drawing	-	-	-	-	-	0	2	2	-	-	-	4	2	2	2	2	2	10
Physical education (Sports)	2	2	2	2	2	10	2	2	2	2	2	10	2	2	2	2	2	10
Total hours per week	27	28	29	27	29	130	28	29	28	30	30	135	30	28	29	28	29	134

=== Ginnasio liceo moderno ===
Activated from 1911 to 1923.

Subjects	Gymnasium		Lyceum		
Subjects	IV	V	I	II	III
Italian	4	4	3	3	3
Latin	5	5	3	3	2
French	3	3	4	-	-
German or English	4	4	3	3	3
History and geography	3	3	4	4	2
Law, economy and philosophy	-	-	-	3	4
Mathematics	2	2	4	3	3
Physics and chemistry	-	-	4	3	3
Natural sciences	2	2	-	3	3
Drawing	2	2	-	-	-
Physical education	2	2	2	2	2
Total hours per week	27	27	27	27	25

== Features ==
Compared to the traditional liceo, which since then began to be called liceo classico, in the face of the absence of the (Ancient) Greek and the lightening of Latin, it provided for the teaching of a second foreign language (German or English, which flanked French), of law, of economy and a slight increase in scientific subjects.

The lower gymnasium, thati is the first three-years period of gymnasium (one of the lower secondary schools that followed the four-year elementary school), remained unique and unchanged, then opted for the fourth year of ginnasio (classico) or for the fourth year of ginnasio moderno. The diploma issued allowed access to any university faculty. The ginnasio liceo moderno was suppressed in 1923.

== See also ==
- Secondary education in Italy
- Education in Italy
