= Liceo delle scienze umane =

Type of secondary school in Italy

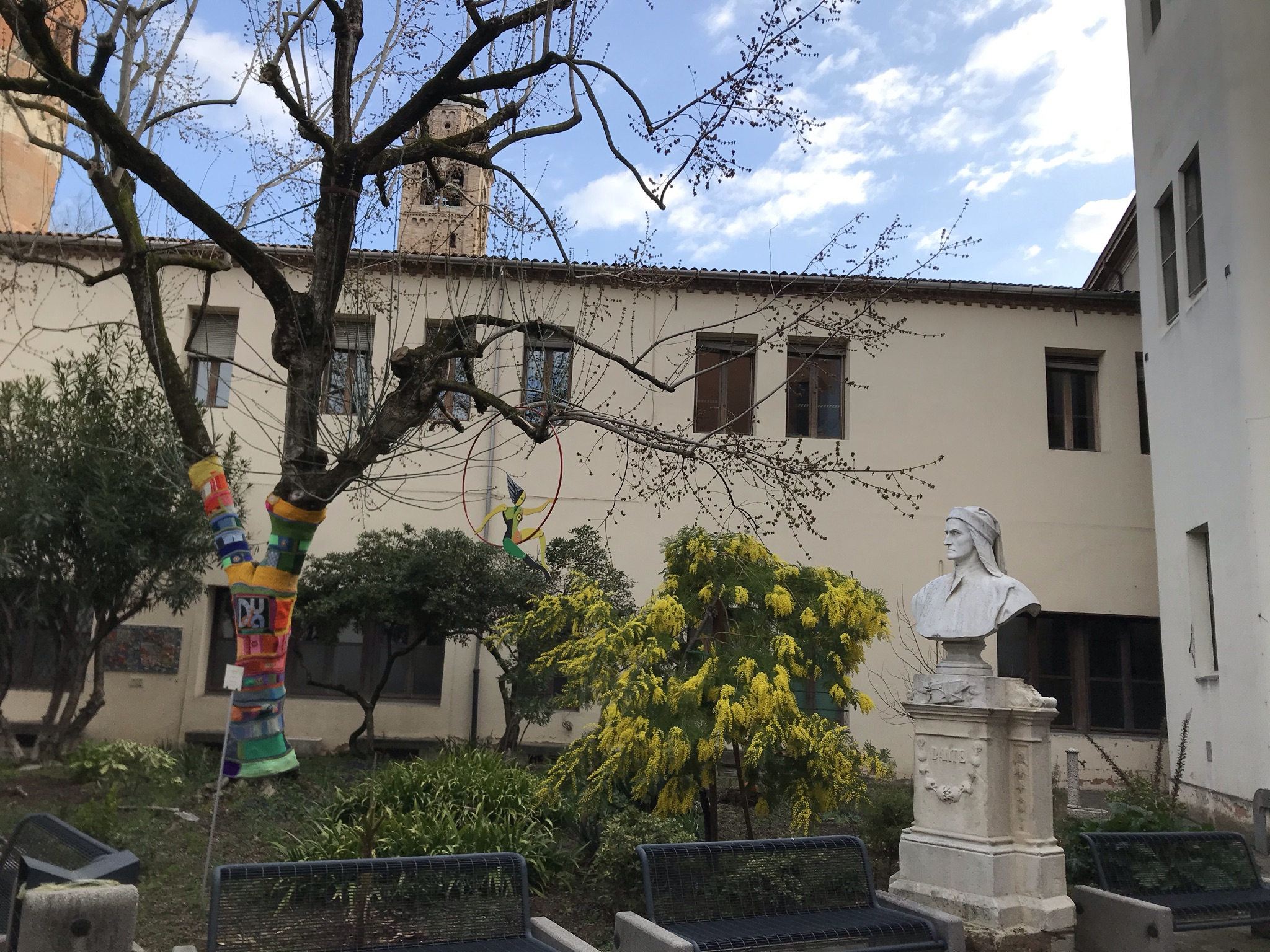
Liceo delle scienze umane in Padua

Liceo delle scienze umane (literally "Human and Social Sciences Lyceum") is a type of secondary school in Italy. It is designed to give students the skills to progress to any university or higher educational institution, but specifically devoted to human sciences related topics. Students can attend the liceo delle scienze umane after graduating from scuola media (middle school).

The curriculum is devised by the Ministry of Education, and emphasises the link between psychology, anthropology, sociology, and pedagogy. It covers a complete and widespread range of disciplines.

Students typically study for five years, and attend the school from the age of 14 to 19. At the end of the fifth year all students sit for the esame di Stato ("state exam"), a final examination which gave access to every university course.

A student attending a liceo is called "liceale", although the more generic terms studente (male) and studentessa (female) are also in common use. Teachers are known as professore (male) or professoressa (female).

== History ==
The school was instituted by the 1923 Gentile Reform undern the name of Istituto Magistrale, whose purpose was to form teachers for the Italian primary school. With a four-years curriculum, the Istituto Magistrale and the liceo artistico were the unique Italian secondary schools to have a duration less than fived years. Under the Gentile Reform, the Italian liceo classico was the unique Italian school from which a student could register to the first year of the university, after having passed a final exam called "matura".

In 1940, a member of the Italian Ministry of Education, Giuseppe Bottai, approved the Carta della Scuola, a reform which extended the duration of the Istituto Magistrale from four to five years. The latter year was mainly based on a mandatory teaching apprenticeship to be held in primary school classrooms under the tutorship of a senior and enrolled teacher. The Istituto Magistrale students were enabled to enroll to the Faculty of Economy and Commerce (in Italian: Facoltà di economia e commercio) and to the Magistero, a faculty that was reserved to the Istituto Magistrale students.

The Istituto Magistrale was organized as a single-sex school. In 1951 female students were enabled by law to access the Magistero Faculty.

In 1969 the Fiorentino Sullo reform opened the access to the Italian university, giving to the students of all the Italian secondary schools the right to enroll to any faculty. To get enrolled to the university, the Istituto Magistrale and the liceo artistico students were obliged to frequent an integrative year because the ordinary duration of their scholastic curriculums was of four years.

== See also ==
- List of schools in Italy
