= Secondary education in Italy =

Secondary education in Italy lasts eight years and is divided in two stages: scuola secondaria di primo grado ("lower secondary school"), also known as scuola media, corresponding to the ISCED 2011 Level 2, middle school and scuola secondaria di secondo grado ("upper secondary school"), which corresponds to the ISCED 2011 Level 3, high school. The middle school lasts three years from the age of 11 to age 14, and the upper secondary from 14 to 19.

== Scuola secondaria di primo grado ("Middle school") ==
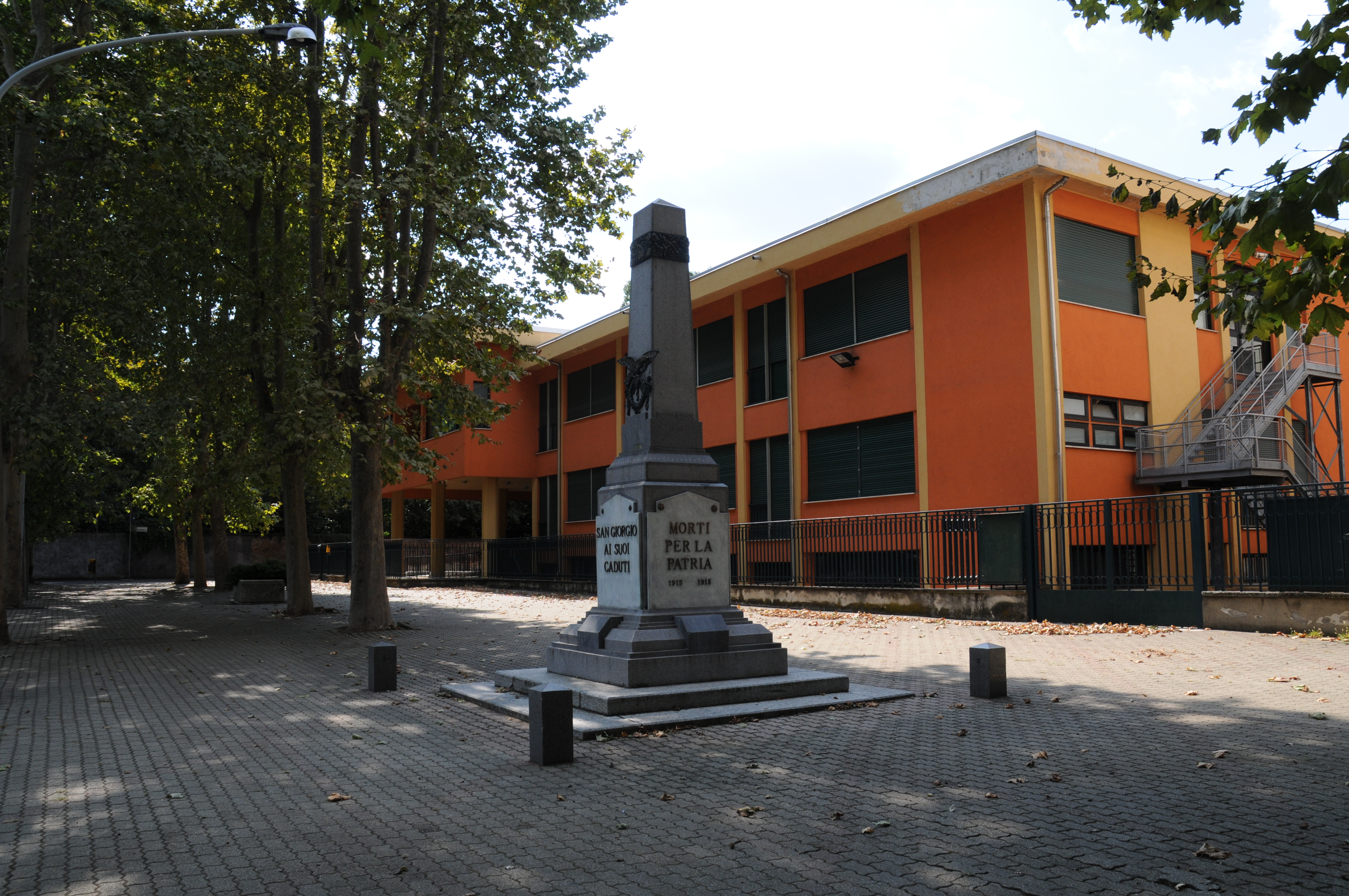
A scuola secondaria di primo grado (aka scuola media), in San Giorgio su Legnano

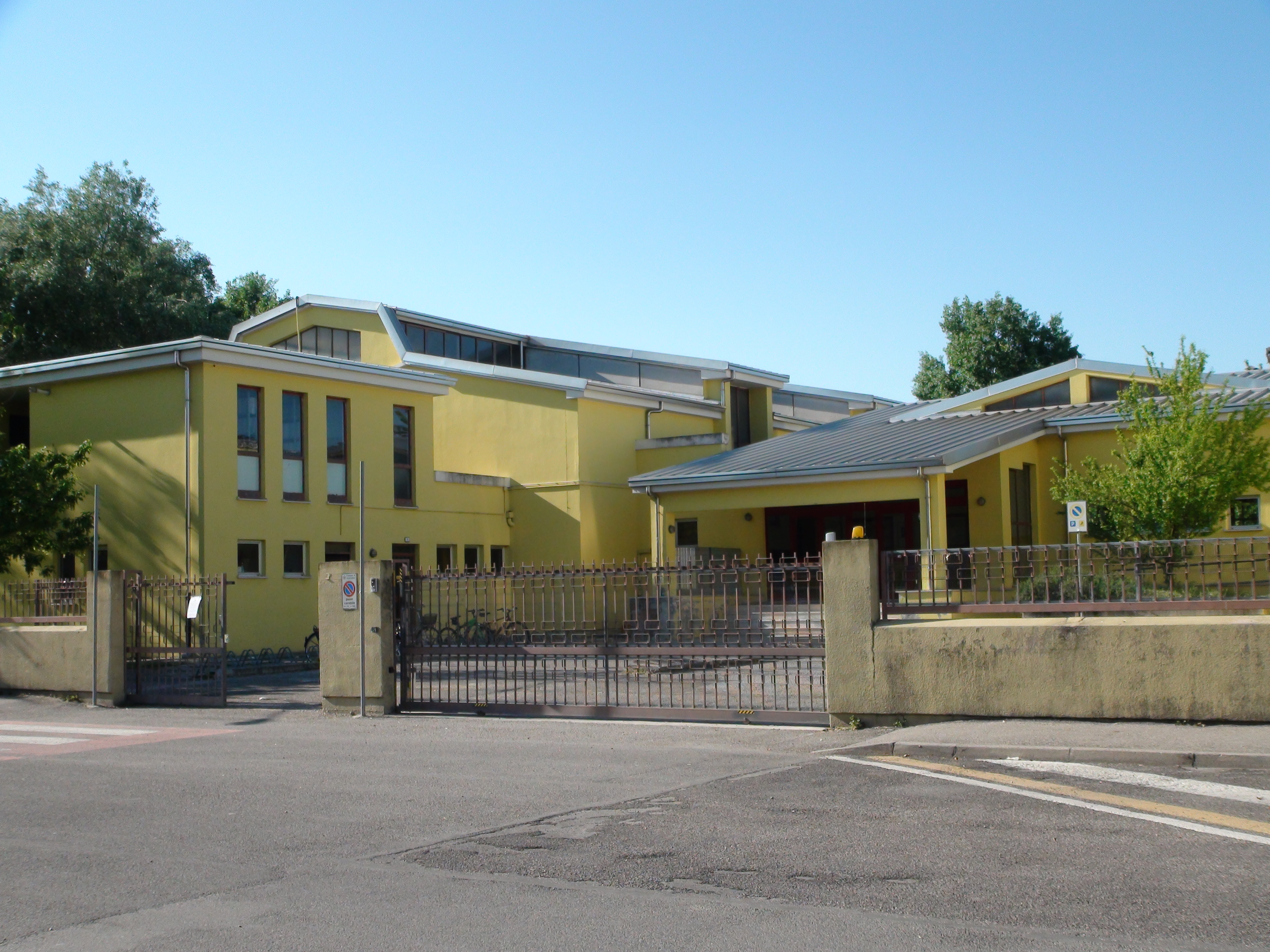
A scuola secondaria di primo grado (aka scuola media), in Suzzara

The scuola secondaria di primo grado (lower secondary school), commonly known as scuola media inferiore (lit. 'Lower middle school') or scuola media ("Middle school"), it follows the definition of an ISCED 2011 Level 2 school. It is compulsory for all pupils. It lasts for three years, roughly from age 11 to 14. It is the first stage where students are taught by subject specialists. It consolidates the subjects taught at the scuola primaria, adding technology, music and a language other than English (typically French, German or Spanish, even though most primary schools already teach some basics of two foreign languages). (Note: Before the Moratti reform the scuola secondaria di primo grado was called scuola media inferiore)

The middle school has a common program of study for all pupils; it covers all the classic subjects that would be recognised in a comprehensive school: Italian language and literature, history, geography, mathematics, natural sciences, English and a second foreign Language, technology, art (both history and practical), music, civics and physical education.

=== Lower secondary school exam ===
At the end of the third year, students take an examination which includes:

- Four tests, three written tests prepared by each examining board:
  - prima prova ("first test", up to 15 points), an Italian language written test;
  - seconda prova ("second test", up to 15 points), a test on the scientific subjects;
  - terza prova ("third test", not for all courses up to 15 points), an additional test in the foreign languages.
- An oral exam:
  - colloquio orale ("oral interview", up to 10 points), an overall oral examination where the exam committee assess a presentation made by the pupil and ask related questions.

The final score is given as an average of the test scores – a number from 0 to 10. 6 and above are considered pass marks. Successful students receive a diploma di licenza media ("lower secondary school diploma").

== Scuola secondaria di secondo grado ("high school") ==
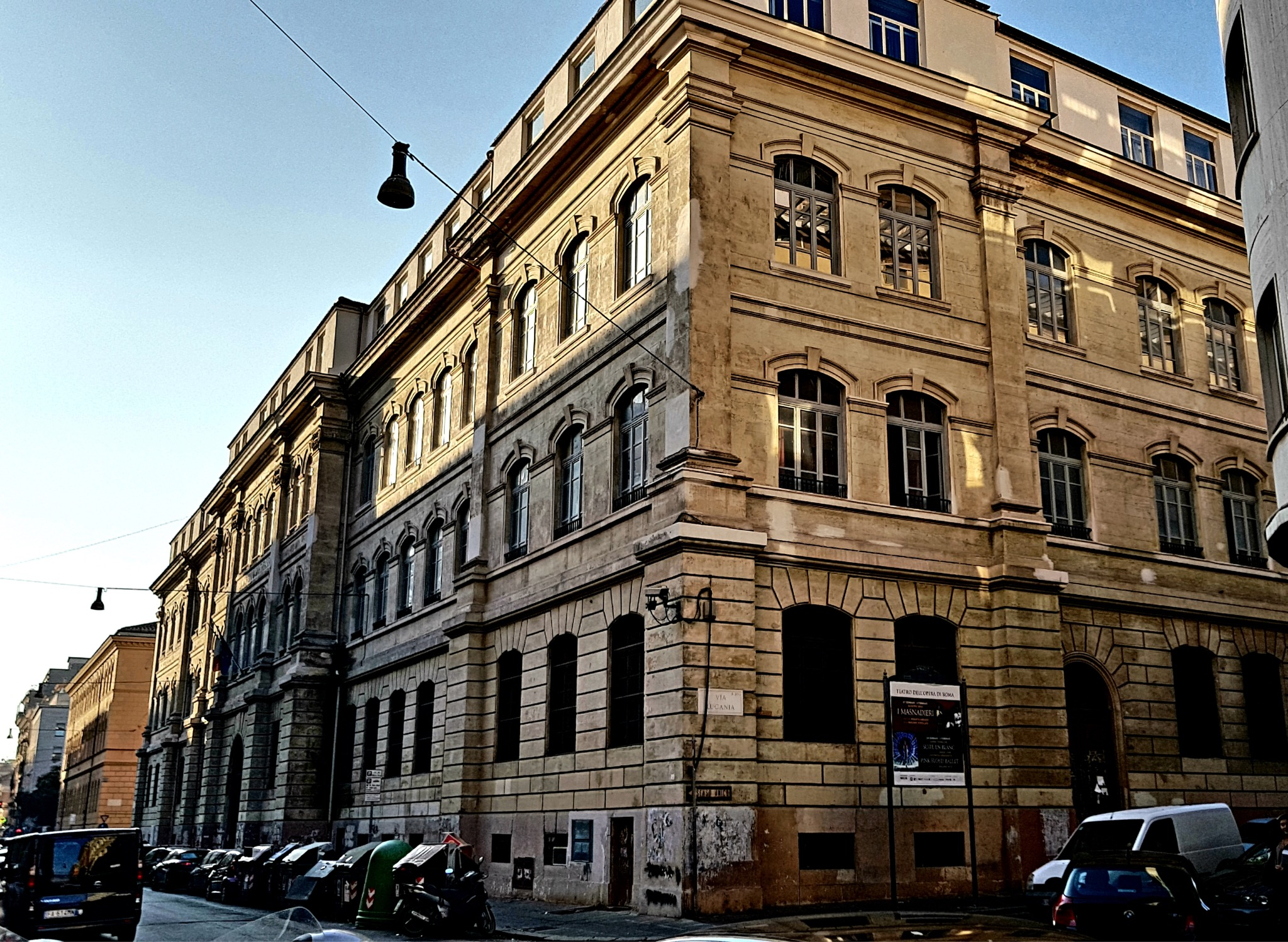
A high school in Rome, the Liceo Torquato Tasso

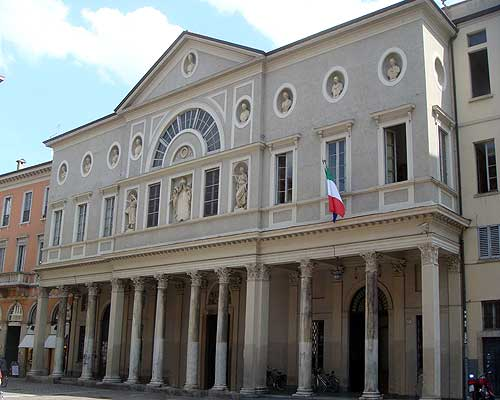
A high school in Como, the Liceo Alessandro Volta

The scuola secondaria di secondo grado ("upper secondary school") – commonly known as scuola media superiore (lit. 'high middle school') or scuola superiore ("high school") – lasts five years. (Note: Before the Gelmini's school reform (2010), some istituti professionali once offered a vocational certificate after three years.) It follows closely the pattern of typical ISCED 2011 Level 3 school. The first two years when the student will be under 16 years old, are compulsory, the other three years are voluntary. There is an exam at the end of the final year, called esame di stato or, previously, the esame di maturità ("maturity exam"); this exam takes place every year between June and July. The course is designed to give students the skills and qualifications needed to progress to university or higher education college.

Students may choose what level of school to attend, there are three types of scuola secondaria di secondo grado that range from the academic to the vocational. All students follow a common course of core subjects during the first two years augmented by subjects from their elected specialism.

- Liceo ("lyceum"), which is aimed at preparing students for university.
- Istituto tecnico ("technical college"), which includes practical work relating to a specific industry or trade, and still leads to a university entrance qualification.
- Istituto professionale ("vocational college"), which includes practical work relating to a specific industry or trade.

Programs of study are generally introduced at national level. Currently, most secondary schools provide some common structure and core subjects (such as Italian language and literature, history, geography, philosophy, mathematics, physics, biology, chemistry, one or more foreign language and physical education), while other topics are specific to one type of establishment (i.e. Ancient Greek and Latin in the liceo classico; economy and law in a istituto tecnico economico; art history and drawing in a liceo artistico). A typical Italian student is age 19 when they enter university, while in other countries 18 is the more common age.

In 2018, the Italian secondary education was evaluated as below the OECD average. Italy scored below the OECD average in reading and science, and near OECD average in mathematics. Mean performance in Italy declined in reading and science, and remained stable in mathematics. Trento and Bolzano scored at an above the national average in reading. Compared to school children in other OECD countries, children in Italy missed out on a greater amount of learning due to absences and indiscipline in classrooms. A wide gap exists between northern schools, which perform near average, and schools in the South, that had much poorer results.

=== Liceo ===
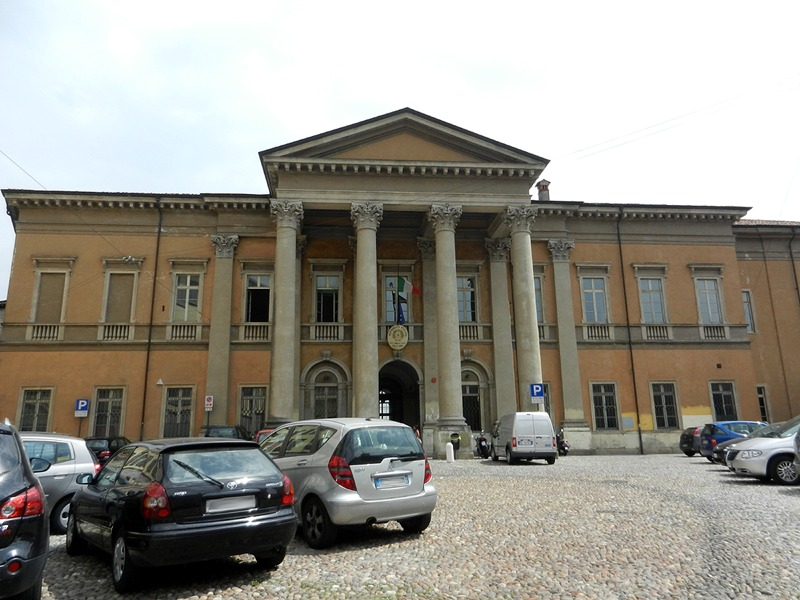
A high school in Bergamo, the Liceo Classico Paolo Sarpi

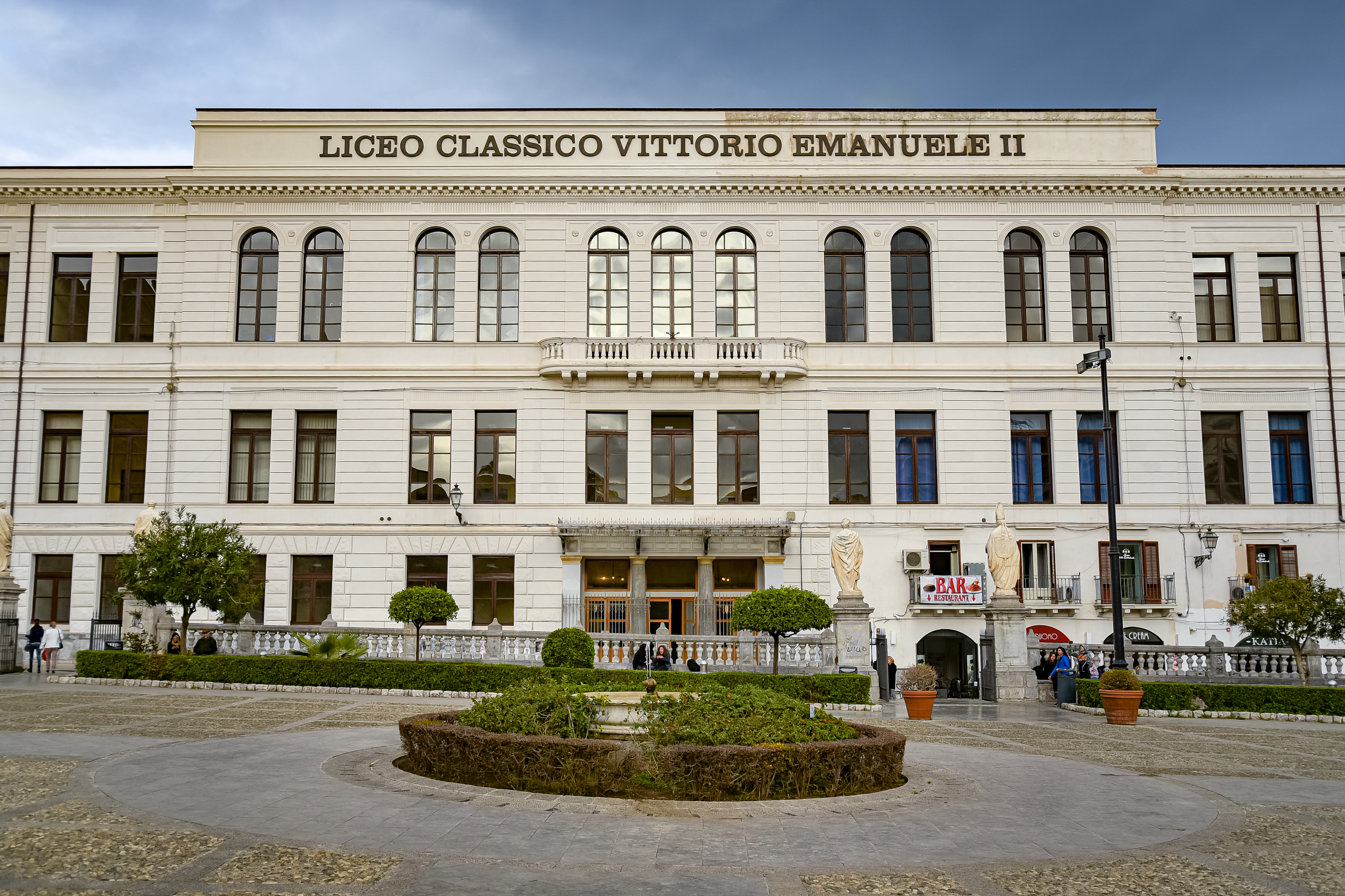
A high school in Palermo, the Liceo classico Vittorio Emanuele II

The education offered by a liceo ("lyceum") is mostly academic. Individual lyceums will cover the core subjects and specialise in specific fields of study; this may be the humanities, science, or art. The principal focus is to prepare students for university and higher education.

Types of liceo include:

- Liceo classico ("Classics") (1859) – dedicated to humanities, with Latin, Ancient Greek, Italian, history and philosophy as the principal subjects.
- Liceo scientifico ("Scientific lyceum") (since 1911) – dedicated to scientific studies, shares a part of its program with liceo classico in teaching Italian, Latin, history and philosophy, but is more oriented towards mathematics, physics, chemistry, biology, earth science and computer science.
- Liceo scientifico scienze applicate ("Applied Sciences") – an offshoot of the Liceo scientifico, it replaces the Latin requirement with ICT and more natural science classes.
- Liceo scientifico sportivo ("Sporty") – an offshoot of the Liceo scientifico, it lacks art history and drawing and focuses on PE.
- Liceo linguistico ("Languages") (since 1973) – puts emphasis on modern foreign languages learning; the languages usually taught are English, French, Spanish and German – although recently Russian, Arabic and in particular Chinese have been introduced as well. As in liceo classico, also mathematics, physics, chemistry, biology, earth science, history and philosophy are taught.
- Liceo delle scienze umane ("Human sciences"). This became classed as a lyceum in 1998. Previously this had been called – scuola normale ("Normal school") (1859–1923), then – istituto magistrale ("Magistral institute") (1923–1998) – here the emphasis is more on relational, behavioural and educational, such as pedagogy, anthropology, psychology, sociology, and social research. It replaces the previous normal school which once trained primary school teachers.
- Liceo artistico ("Artistic lyceum") (since 1923) – which is oriented toward arts teaching – both in a theoretical (i.e. art history) and practical (i.e. drawing sessions) way. Its subjects are painting, sculpture, decoration, graphics, design, audiovisual, multimedia, scenography and architecture.
- Liceo musicale e coreutico ("Music and dance lyceum") (since 2010) – often linked with a conservatory, which comprises two sectors:
  - musicale – which specializes in music and teaches students to play an instrument.
  - coreutico – which specializes in dance and choreography.
- Liceo Made in Italy (since 2024) – dedicated to the study and promotion of Italian cultural and entrepreneurial excellence. It shares a part of its program with other licei in teaching Italian, history, philosophy, and mathematics, but is more oriented towards economics, law, business culture, marketing, and the history and values of the "Made in Italy" brand.

Historically:

- Liceo moderno ("modern languages") (1911–1923) – dedicated to foreign languages, featuring Latin, Italian, French, one other foreign language (English or German), History and Geography.

=== Istituto tecnico ===
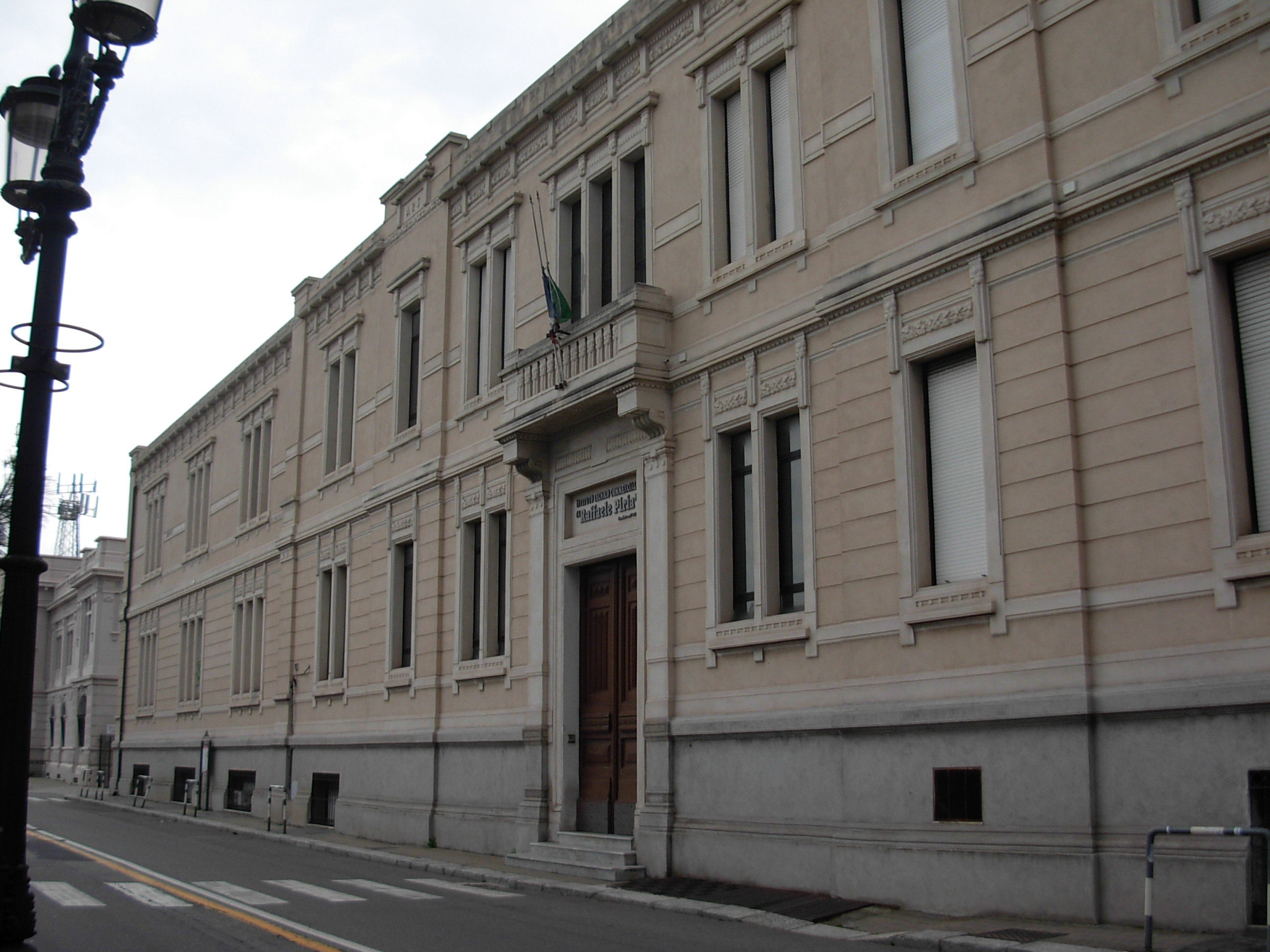
A high school in Empoli, the istituto tecnico economico Raffaele Piria

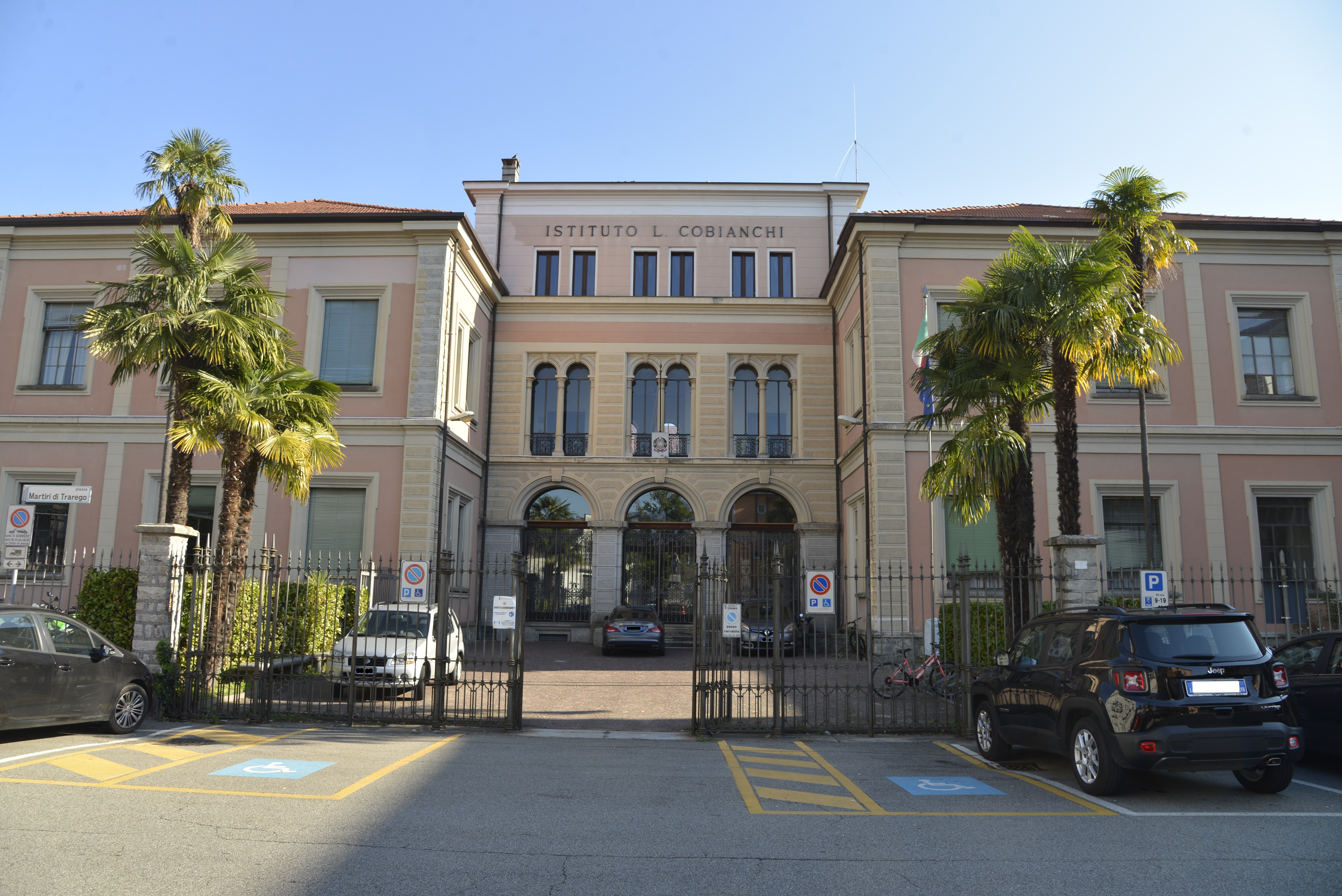
A high school in Verbania, the istituto tecnico tecnologico Lorenzo Cobianchi

The education given in an istituto tecnico (technical) offers both a wide theoretical and practical education and a highly qualified technical specialization in a specific field of studies (e.g.: economy, humanities, administration, law, accountancy, tourism, information technology), often integrated with a three-six months internship in a company, association or university, during the fifth and last year of study.

Types of "istituto tecnico" include:

- Istituto tecnico economico ("Economic institute") – dedicated to economics and management, offers a broad theoretical and practical education oriented toward specific subjects, such as law, economy, politics, accountancy; and it comprises three sub-types:
  - Amministrazione, finanza e marketing ("Administration, finance and marketing") – which specialises in economy, law, accounting, political sciences, management and marketing
  - Sistemi Informativi Aziendali ("IT") – which specialises in IT and Information Systems
  - Turistico ("Tourism") – which specialises in tourism as well as International Relations
- Istituto tecnico tecnologico ("Technological institute") – dedicated to technology, offers a broad theoretical and practical education oriented toward specific subjects, such as informatics, electronics, chemical industry, biotechnology, construction management, geotechnics, fashion; and it comprises eight sub-types:
  - Meccanica, meccatronica ed energia ("Mechanics, mechatronics and energy")
  - Trasporti e logistica ("Transport and logistics")
  - Elettronica ed elettrotecnica ("Electronics and electrical engineering")
  - Grafica e comunicazioni ("Graphics and communications")
  - Chimica, materiali e biotecnologie ("Chemistry, materials and biotechnology")
  - Sistema moda ("Fashion system")
  - Agraria, agroalimentare e agroindustria ("Agriculture, agro-food and agro-industry")
  - Costruzioni, ambiente e territorio ("Constructions, enviromet and territory")

=== Istituto professionale ===
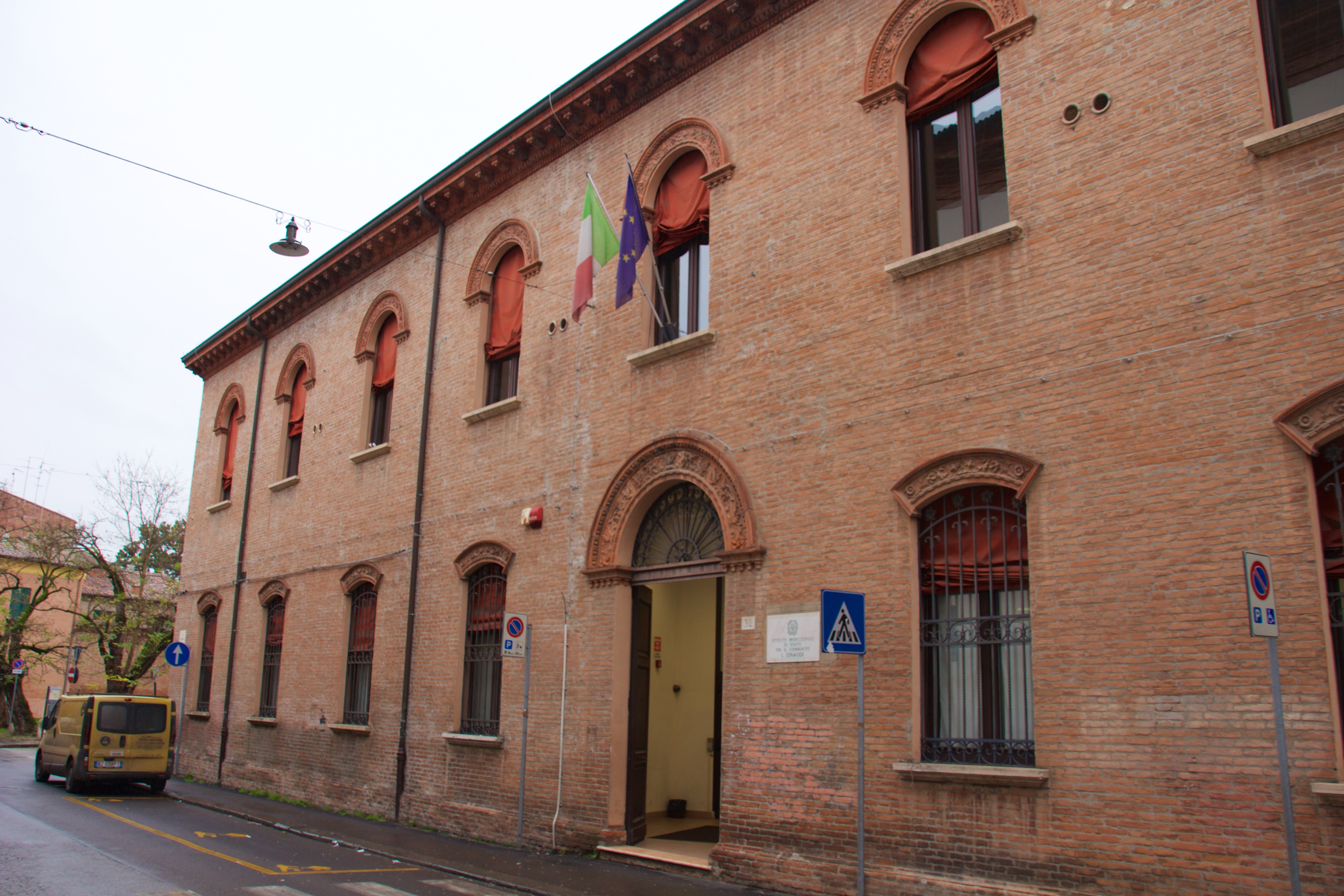
A high school in Ferrara, the istituto professionale Luigi Einaudi

The istituto professionale ("professional institute") has a practical education with a duration of 5 years specifically structured for practical activities, with the aim to facilitate the direct entry of the pupil to the labour market (technical, agriculture, gastronomy, handicrafts).

This type of school offers a form of vocational education oriented towards practical subjects and enabling the students to start work as soon as they have completed their studies.

== Adult education ==
The Italian school system also features the scuola serale (evening school), aimed at adults and working students.

The istituto d'arte was once a specific type of istituto professionale which offered an education focused on art history and drawing. Today it forms part of the liceo artistico.

== Terminal examination ==
Every kind of Italian secondary high school ends with an examination whose final score is on a 100-point scale:

- up to 40 points for the general marks obtained through the last three years (students with an average mark of nine are awarded with, respectively, 12 points for the third to last year, 13 points for the penultimate year, and 15 points for the final year. Students barely passing each year are awarded 24 points in total);
- up to 40 points on two different written tests:
  - Prima prova (first test, up to 20 points), an Italian language written test, decided at national level and the same for all examinees: either textual comprehension and critique, or the writing of an essay (a first test judged sufficient is awarded at least 13 points). In those parts of Italy where Italian is not the only official language, the first test can be alternatively held in the local co-official language (German in the province of Bolzano, Slovenian in some areas of the province of Trieste and Ladin in some municipalities of the provinces of Trento and Bolzano. For Aosta Valley, where French is co-official, a fourth written test - Italian: quarta prova or French: quatrième épreuve - is mandatory, being both Italian and French languages considered evenly in this region's educational system);
  - seconda prova (second test, up to 20 points), a written test on a subject dependent on the kind of school attended, decided at national level for each different path (a second test judged sufficient is awarded at least 13 points).
- colloquio orale (oral interview, up to 20 points), an overall oral test (prova orale) regarding all the subjects of the last year. During the oral test, the exam committee grades a presentation made by the examinee related to the final year's arguments and poses questions related to the presentation or to the previous tests (an oral test judged sufficient is awarded at least 13 points);
- up to five points (to a maximum of 100) in cases the examining board judges appropriate to meriting students whom, at the end of the third written test, had at least 70 points in total.

Students are examined by an exam committee which is divided equally between their own teachers and teachers from other schools. The first and second tests are written by the Ministry of Education, while the oral test is prepared and administered by the exam committee.

The total score is the sum of the pre-exam score, the written tests' scores and the oral test score. If the total points exceed 100, the final score is reduced to 100. If, during the years, the students stand out for their scores (the student never gets less than 8 in the final scores of the last three year, and has more than 9,1 as GPA), they get a "100 cum laude", which gives students a reduction of the first year's university fees. The secondary high school exam is passed with a score of 60 or more, and any secondary high school diploma is valid for access to any university course of any university faculty.

This system has changed many times during the last 20 years; before, the score was expressed in terms of sixtieths so the exam was passed with a score of 36/60 or more, and the top score was 60/60; this was a consequence of being the sum of the scores expressed by the 6 members of the evaluating team, each of them having the ability to express a score in a range from 1 to 10.

The secondary high school exam is officially called esame di Stato (state exam), although the old name esame di maturità (maturity exam) is still in common use.

== Summary ==
Education and certificate awarded:

level	name	duration	certificate awarded
Lower secondary education ISCED 2011; Level 2	Scuola secondaria di primo grado; "scuola media" (first grade secondary school; "middle school")	3 years (age: 11 to 14)	Diploma di scuola secondaria di primo grado
Upper secondary education ISCED 2011; Level 3	Scuola secondaria di secondo grado; "scuola superiore" (second grade secondary school; "high school")	5 years (age: 14 to 19)	Diploma di liceo Diploma di istituto tecnico Diploma di istituto professionale

== See also ==
- Education in Italy
- List of schools in Italy
- Ministry of Education, Universities and Research (Italy)
