= Gentile Reform =

Italian educational system reform

The Gentile Reform of 1923 was a reform of the Italian educational system through a series of normative acts (royal legislative decrees of 31 December 1922, n. 1679, 16 July 1923, n. 1753, 6 May 1923, n. 1054, 30 September 1923, n. 2102 and 1 October 1923, n. 2185), by the neo-idealist philosopher Giovanni Gentile, minister of education in Benito Mussolini's first cabinet. It officially recognized 21 universities in Italy.

== Results ==
- The compulsory age of education was raised to 10 years (only elementary education), and was somewhat based on a ladder system: after the first five years of primary instruction, one could choose the scuola media, which would give further access to the "liceo" and other secondary instruction, or the avviamento al lavoro, which was intended to give a quick entry into the low strata of the workforce.
- Gentile created the liceo classico (intended to be the peak of secondary education, with the goal of forming the future upper classes), the only secondary school that gave access to all types of university. Gentile also created technical, commercial and industrial institutes.
- Philosophy became the most important matter of teaching in the Italian liceo classico. Philosophy courses were given in its last three years. According to the actual idealism, the teaching of history and of philosophy began to be covered by a unique common professor. Similarly, it was instituted a unique five-years laurea in history and philosophy, intended as two disciplines linked in a hermeneutic circle. The Gentile reform abolished any curriculum and syllabus defined by the Italian government at a national level, giving a full freedom of education to the philosophy teachers. The secondary school Matura started to be regulated by a national exam program to which any scholastic institute should be compliant. Scholastic manuals were substituted by a lecture and critical debate on the Latin and ancient Greek philosophical texts. Philosophy acquired an ancillary role above all the other teaching matters of the Italian liceo classico. It was not intended as a set of contents in terms of historical notions, authors and works, but as a discipline capable to educate scholars to use the reason and their free-thinking, to develop a critical and systematic spirit which could enable them to order, unify and practically derive all their knowledge from a unitarian principle. Philosophy was identified as the principal trait of the Italian national identity and spirit, as well as a form of thought centered on the teacher, typically a male who practically lived and exchanged his mental habit along with his scholars. Gentile's concerns on the philosophy teaching were expressed in the writings titled L'insegnamento della filosofia nei licei (1901), Per l'insegnamento della storia della filosofia (1916) and Difesa della filosofia (1921).
- Instruction in languages other than Italian was abolished, which affected mainly the German language schools in South Tyrol, and Slovene and Croatian language schools in the Julian March.

== Sources ==
- G. Tognon, Giovanni Gentile e la riforma della scuola, in Il parlamento italiano, Milano, Nuova Cei, 1990, vol. 11
