= Gelmini reform =

Italian educational reform

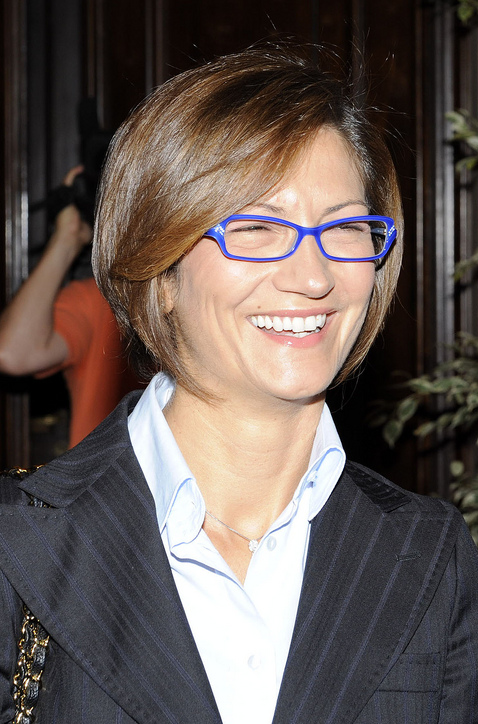
Mariastella Gelmini

The Gelmini reform (Italian: riforma Gelmini) refers to the set of acts of the Italian Republic – issued during the Berlusconi IV Cabinet – concerning the education sector in Italy.

Entering into force during the Minister of Education, university and Research Mariastella Gelmini's term of office between 2008 and 2011, it profoundly altered the Moratti reform of 2003.

== General synopsis ==
Some interventions, contained in some articles of Law 6 August 2008, n. 133, were followed by Law 30 October 2008, n. 169, whose main purpose was to reform the entire Italian school system.

The compulsory education ^{[IT]} reform took place on 1 September 2009 for primary and lower secondary schools, and for higher secondary schools on 1 September 2010. Regarding universities, Law 240/2010, promulgated on 30 December of the same year, came into force on 1 January 2011.

== The acts ==
=== Law 6 August 2008, n. 133 ===
The Law-Decree 25 June 2008, n. 112 ^{[IT]} (Disposizioni urgenti per lo sviluppo economico, la semplificazione, la competitività, la stabilizzazione della finanza pubblica e la perequazione tributaria, English: Urgent disposals for economic development, simplification, competitiveness, stabilization of public finances and tax equalization), later Law 6 August 2008, n. 133, although it mainly concerned public finance, it also included some provisions for schools and universities (in particular Articles 15, 16, 17, 64 and 66).

=== Law 30 October 2008, n. 169 ===
The Law-Decree 1 September 2008, n. 137 (Disposizioni urgenti in materia di istruzione e università, English: Urgent disposals about education and university), later law 30 October 2008, n. 169 is an act adopted on 30 October 2008 which contains a series of changes concerning the Italian public education system. This decree, however, concerned essentially the primary (formerly elementary school) and secondary (formerly middle and high schools) schools: the main innovations in university education were contained in the three-year financial law (law 133/2008) and in the subsequent decree pertaining to universities.

=== Law 9 January 2009, n. 1 ===
The Law-Decree 10 November 2008 n. 180 (Disposizioni urgenti per il diritto allo studio, la valorizzazione del merito e la qualità del sistema universitario e della ricerca, English: Urgent disposals for the right to education, the valorisation of merit and the quality of the university system and research), later Law 9 January 2009, n. 1, published in the Official Gazette n. 6 of the 9 January 2009.

DpR 15 March 2010, nn. 87 (Professional institutes), 88 (Technical institutes), 89 (Lyceums)

Regulations for the reorganization of lyceums, technical institutes and professional institutes issued by the President of the Republic on 15 March 2010 (Registered at the Court of Auditors on 1 June 2010). Complemented by National Guidelines, Programs and Guidelines for the three types of high schools.

=== Law 30 December 2010, n. 240 ===
The Law-Decree 30 December 2010, n. 240 (Norme in materia di organizzazione delle università, di personale accademico e reclutamento, nonché delega al Governo per incentivare la qualità e l'efficienza del sistema universitario, English Rules about organization of universities, academic staff and recruitment, as well as delegation to the Government to encourage the quality and efficiency of the university system), published on the Official Gazette of the 14 January 2011, formally entered into force on 29 January 2011. It is also known as a draft of the Senate law 1905, but during the parliamentary approval, the original bill was significantly modified.

The law radically changes the whole system of governance for Italian universities, redefining the university governing bodies and dictating different disposals about teaching staff (professors and researchers). The rule, however, contained numerous delegations to the Italian Government to issue decrees to implement the various aspects of the reform.

=== Ministerial Decree n. 17 of 22 September 2010 ===
The Ministerial Decree n. 17 of 22 September 2010 registered at the Court of Auditors on 20 January 2011 determines the Requirements for the courses of study.
