= List of schools in United States territories =

This is a list of schools associated with United States overseas military operations in Europe and the Pacific, and in unincorporated U.S. territories.

== Armed Forces Europe ==
=== Bahrain ===
- Bahrain School, Manama

=== Belgium ===
- Brussels American School, Brussels
- SHAPE Elementary School, Mons, Hainaut
- SHAPE High School, Mons, Hainaut

=== Germany ===
- Ansbach Elementary School, Ansbach, Bavaria
- Ansbach Middle High School, Ansbach, Bavaria
- Aukamm Elementary School, Wiesbaden, Hesse
- Bamberg Elementary School, Bamberg, Bavaria
- Bamberg High School, Bamberg, Bavaria
- Baumholder High School, Baumholder, Rhineland-Palatinate
- Berlin American High School, Berlin
- Bitburg Elementary School, Bitburg, Rhineland-Palatinate
- Bitburg Middle School, Bitburg, Rhineland-Palatinate
- Bitburg High School, Bitburg, Rhineland-Palatinate
- Böblingen Elementary School, Stuttgart, Baden-Württemberg
- Bremen American High School, Bremen
- Frankfurt American High School, Frankfurt, Hesse
- Garmisch Elementary School, Garmisch-Partenkirchen, Bavaria
- Grafenwöhr Elementary School, Grafenwöhr, Bavaria
- Grafenwöhr Middle School, Grafenwöhr, Bavaria
- Hainerberg Elementary School, Wiesbaden, Hesse
- Heidelberg Middle School, Heidelberg, Baden-Württemberg
- Heidelberg High School, Heidelberg, Baden-Württemberg
- Hohenfels Elementary School, Hohenfels, Bavaria
- Hohenfels High School, Hohenfels, Bavaria
- Kaiserslautern Elementary School, Kaiserslautern, Rhineland-Palatinate
- Kaiserslautern Middle School, Kaiserslautern, Rhineland-Palatinate
- Kaiserslautern High School, Kaiserslautern, Rhineland-Palatinate
- Landstuhl Elementary Middle School, Landstuhl, Rhineland-Palatinate
- Mannheim Elementary School, Mannheim, Baden-Württemberg
- Mannheim Middle School, Mannheim, Baden-Württemberg
- Mannheim High School, Mannheim, Baden-Württemberg
- Munich American High School, Munich, Bavaria
- Nurnberg American High School, Furth, Bavaria
- Patch Elementary School, Stuttgart, Baden-Württemberg
- Patch High School, Stuttgart, Baden-Württemberg
- Patrick Henry Elementary School, Heidelberg, Baden-Württemberg
- Ramstein Elementary School, Ramstein Air Base, Rhineland-Palatinate
- Ramstein Intermediate School, Ramstein Air Base, Rhineland-Palatinate
- Ramstein Middle School, Ramstein Air Base, Rhineland-Palatinate
- Ramstein High School, Ramstein Air Base, Rhineland-Palatinate
- Robinson Barracks Middle School, Stuttgart, Baden-Württemberg
- Smith Elementary School, Baumholder, Rhineland-Palatinate
- Stuttgart Elementary School Stuttgart Baden-Würtenburg
- Stuttgart High School Stuttgart Baden-Würtemberg*
- Vilseck Elementary School, Vilseck, Bavaria
- Vilseck High School, Vilseck, Bavaria
- Wiesbaden Middle School, Wiesbaden, Hesse
- Wiesbaden High School, Wiesbaden, Hesse
- Würzburg American High School, Würzburg, Bavaria

=== Italy ===
- Aviano Elementary School, Aviano, Province of Pordenone
- Aviano Middle School, Aviano, Province of Pordenone
- Aviano High School, Aviano, Province of Pordenone
- Livorno Elementary and Middle School, Livorno, Tuscany
- Naples Elementary School, Gricignano di Aversa, Campania
- Naples American High School, Gricignano di Aversa, Campania
- Sigonella Elementary School, west of Catania, Province of Catania
- Sigonella High School, west of Catania, Province of Catania
- Vicenza Elementary School, Vicenza, Province of Vicenza
- Vicenza American High School, Vicenza, Province of Vicenza

=== Netherlands ===
- AFNORTH Elementary School, Brunssum
- AFNORTH High School, Brunssum

=== Portugal ===
- Lajes Elementary/High School, Lajes, Azores

=== Spain ===
- David Glasgow Farragut Elementary School (formerly Rota Elementary School), Rota, Cádiz
- David Glasgow Farragut High School (formerly Rota High School), Rota, Cádiz

=== Turkey ===
- Ankara Elementary/High School (previously named George C. Marshall School), Ankara, Ankara Province
- Incirlik Elementary/High School, İncirlik, Adana Province

Gazi Koleji

=== United Kingdom ===
- Alconbury Elementary School, Huntingdon, Cambridgeshire
- Alconbury High School, Huntingdon, Cambridgeshire
- Croughton American School, Northamptonshire
- Feltwell Elementary School, Feltwell, Norfolk
- Lakenheath Elementary School, Lakenheath, Suffolk
- Lakenheath Middle School, Feltwell, Norfolk
- Lakenheath High School, Lakenheath, Suffolk
- Liberty Intermediate School, Lakenheath, Suffolk
- Menwith Hill Elementary & High School, Harrogate, England

== Armed Forces Pacific ==
=== Guam ===
- Guam High School, Asan
- Andersen Elementary School, Yigo
- Andersen Middle School, Yigo
- Commander William C. McCool Elementary/Middle School, Naval Base Guam

=== Japan ===
==== Aomori Prefecture ====
- Robert D. Edgren High School, Misawa Air Base, Misawa, Aomori
- Sollars Elementary School, Misawa Air Base, Misawa, Aomori
- Cummimngs Elementary School, Misawa Air Base, Misawa, Aomori

==== Kanagawa Prefecture ====
- Zama American High School, Camp Zama, Zama, Kanagawa
- Nile C. Kinnick High School, United States Fleet Activities Yokosuka, Yokosuka, Kanagawa
- Sullivans Elementary School, United States Fleet Activities Yokosuka, Yokosuka, Kanagawa

==== Nagasaki Prefecture ====
- Ernest J. King High School, United States Fleet Activities Sasebo, Sasebo, Nagasaki
- Ernest J. King Middle School, United States Fleet Activities Sasebo, Sasebo, Nagasaki
- John N. Darby Elementary School, United States Fleet Activities Sasebo, Sasebo, Nagasaki
- Sasebo Elementary School, United States Fleet Activities Sasebo, Sasebo, Nagasaki

==== Okinawa Prefecture ====
- Amelia Earhart Intermediate School, Kadena Air Base, Okinawa Island
- Bob Hope Primary School, Kadena Air Base, Okinawa Island
- Lester Middle School, Camp Lester, Okinawa Island
- Kubasaki High School, Camp Foster, Okinawa Island
- Kadena Elementary School, Kadena Air Base, Okinawa Island
- Kadena High School, Kadena Air Base, Okinawa Island
- Kadena Middle School, Kadena Air Base, Okinawa Island
- Ryukyu Middle School, Kadena Air Base, Okinawa Island
- Stearley Heights Elementary School, Kadena Air Base, Okinawa Island

==== Tokyo Prefecture ====
- Joan K. Mendel Elementary School (formerly known as Yokota East Elementary School), Yokota Air Base, Fussa, Tokyo
- Yokota High School, Yokota Air Base, Fussa, Tokyo
- Yokota Middle School, Yokota Air Base, Fussa, Tokyo
- Yokota West Elementary School, Yokota Air Base, Fussa, Tokyo

==== Yamaguchi Prefecture ====
- Matthew C. Perry High School, Marine Corps Air Station Iwakuni, Iwakuni, Yamaguchi
- Matthew C. Perry Elementary School, Marine Corps Air Station Iwakuni, Iwakuni, Yamaguchi
- Iwakuni Elementary School, Marine Corps Air Station Iwakuni, Iwakuni, Yamaguchi
- Iwakuni Middle School, Marine Corps Air Station Iwakuni, Iwakuni, Yamaguchi

=== South Korea ===
- Osan American Elementary School, Songtan, Gyeonggi-do
- Osan Middle School, Songtan, Gyeonggi-do
- Osan American High School, Songtan, Gyeonggi-do
- Seoul American Elementary School, Yongsan-gu, Seoul
- Seoul American Middle School, Yongsan-gu, Seoul
- Seoul American High School, Yongsan-gu, Seoul
- Taegu American School, Daegu, Yeongnam
- ICS International Christian School, Uijeongbu, Camp Red Cloud

== American Samoa ==
- Faga'itua High School, Faga'itua
- Leone High School, Leone
- Manu'a High School, Ta'u
- Nuuuli Technical High School, Nu'uuli
- Samoana High School, Utulei
- Tafuna High School, Tafuna
- Kanana Fou High School, Tafuna
- Marist/Fa'asao High School, Lepuapua
- South Pacific Academy High School, Tafuna
- Manumalo Baptist High School, Malaeimi
- Pacific Horizons School, Tafuna

== Cuba ==
- W.T. Sampson Elementary School, Guantanamo Bay Naval Base, Cuba
- W.T. Sampson High School, Guantanamo Bay Naval Base, Cuba

== Guam ==
- John F. Kennedy High School, Tamuning
- St. John's School, Upper Tumon
- Simon Sanchez High School, Yigo
- Southern High School, Santa Rita
- George Washington High School, Mangilao
- St. Paul Christian School, North Yigo

== Northern Mariana Islands ==
- Kagman High School, Saipan
- Marianas High School, Saipan
- Mt. Carmel School, Saipan
- Rota High School, Rota
- Saipan Southern High School, Saipan
- Tinian Junior/Senior High School, Tinian
- San Antonio Elementary School
- Garapan Elementary School
- Kagman Elementary/ Junior High School
- Dan Dan Elementary School
- William S. Reyes Elementary School
- Gregory T. Camacho Elementary School
- Hopwood Junior High School

== U.S. Virgin Islands ==
- Charlotte Amalie High School, Charlotte Amalie, St. Thomas
- Ivanna Eudora Kean High School, St. Thomas
- Antilles School, St. Thomas, USVI
- All Saints Cathedral School, St. Thomas, USVI
- Sts. Peter and Paul, St. Thomas, USVI
- St. Croix Central High School, St. Croix
- St. Croix Educational Complex High School, St. Croix
- St. Croix Educational Complex Vocational, St. Croix
- Addelita Cancryn Junior High, St. Thomas
- John H. Woodson Junior High School, St. Croix
- Elena L. Christian Junior High, St. Croix
- Arthur Richards Junior High, Frederiksted, St. Croix
- Manor School, St. Croix, USVI
- St. Croix Country Day School

== Puerto Rico ==
- Antilles High School, Fort Buchanan, Puerto Rico
- Antilles Middle School, Fort Buchanan, Puerto Rico
- Antilles Intermediate School, Fort Buchanan, Puerto Rico
- Antilles Elementary School, Fort Buchanan, Puerto Rico
- Ramey School, Aguadilla, PR

== See also ==
- Department of Defense Education Activity
- Department of Defense Dependents Schools

== Notes and references ==
- Stuttgart High School is the new form of Patch Middle School
- Stuttgart Elementary is the new form of Böblingen Elementary School
