= Lejeune High School =

American public school in North Carolina

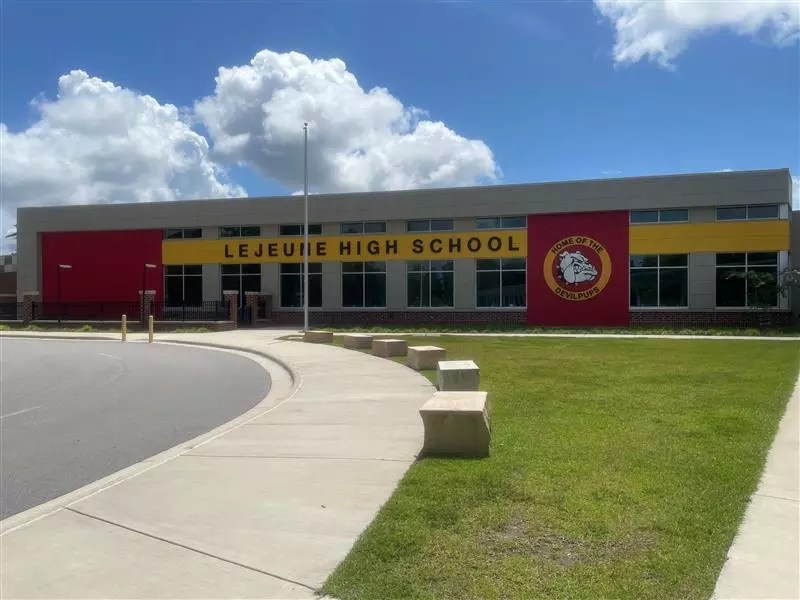

Location
- 835 Stone Street; Jacksonville, North Carolina 28547; United States; 34°42′51″N 77°21′29″W

Information
- Type: Public
- Established: 1944 (82 years ago)
- School district: DoDEA
- CEEB code: 340550
- Principal: Todd Carver
- Faculty: 50
- Grades: 9–12
- Enrollment: 510
- Colors: Scarlet and gold
- Team name: Devilpups
- Feeder schools: Brewster Middle School
- Website: dodea.edu/lejeunehs/

Lejeune High School /ləˈdʒuːn/ is a high school located on the Marine Corps Base Camp Lejeune and in Jacksonville, North Carolina. The school is operated by the Department of Defense Education Activity (DoDEA) of the United States Department of Defense. It is one of seven in the Camp Lejeune Dependant Schools (CLDS), which include one high school, one middle school, one primary school (PK–2), one intermediate school (3–5), and three elementary schools.

Lejeune High School is the only high school located at Camp Lejeune. Its enrollment averages approximately 400 students, varying from Red Day to Gold Day. The students are dependents of military personnel and must either live on base (either at Camp Lejeune or at Marine Corps Air Station New River) or be on a list to get into base housing in order to be eligible to attend LHS.

== History ==
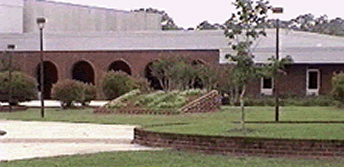
Old campus

Camp Lejeune was founded in 1941. Camp Lejeune High School (CLHS) was founded in 1944, with the first class to graduate being the Class of 1945. In the early days of Camp Lejeune High School, the school was led by a principal and a Marine Officer. With having Marine Officer as part of the faculty, certain military expectations were expected and adhered to such as grooming standards and locker inspections.

Both Camp Lejeune and Camp Lejeune High School take their namesakes from John A. Lejeune, the 13th Commandant of the United States Marine Corps. The students decided in 1944 to take the moniker "Devilpups". This reference is due to the Marine Corps having the nickname of Devil Dog and Camp Lejeune being a Marine Corps base.

The first campus that housed Camp Lejeune High School was located on Brewster Boulevard. In 1961, a new campus was built, the school moved to 825 Stone Street, which housed Brewster Middle School for a time before a new campus was built for that school. A new campus was built for the high school in 1990. Camp Lejeune High School changed its name to Lejeune High School in 1968.

== Academic assessment ==
Students of the DoDEA school system are subject to two assessment standards to measure academic performance. There is the TerraNova (test) which is taken in Grades 3–11. "DoDEA students scored substantially higher than the national average (50th percentile) in all subject areas.". The other test is the SAT. The SAT is not a required test. The participation rate of DoDEA students in 2009 was 67%. The national SAT participation rate was 46%.

=== TerraNova results ===
| Subject Matter | 9th Grade | 10th Grade | 11th Grade |
|---|---|---|---|
| Reading | 80% | 79% | 80% |
| Language | 77% | 75% | 72% |
| Math | 72% | 73% | 69% |
| Science | 75% | 71% | 70% |
| Social Studies | 78% | 79% | 77% |

=== SAT results ===
| SAT | DoDEA | National Average |
|---|---|---|
| Critical Reading | 505 | 501 |
| Math | 498 | 515 |
| Writing | 492 | 493 |

== Campus ==
Currently the campus for Lejeune High is located with its main entrance on Stone Street and another entrance on Brewster Boulevard. The school has land cleared, but continues to use the track and fields located at the current Brewster Middle School.

== Extracurricular activities ==
=== Sports ===
==== Fall season ====
- Football
- Girls’ Volleyball
- Girls’ Tennis
- Cross Country – Boys' and Girls'

==== Winter season ====
- Wrestling
- Basketball – Boys' and Girls'

==== Spring season ====
- Track and Field – Boys' and Girls'
- Boys’ Golf
- Baseball
- Girls' Softball

== Principals ==
- Kerstetter, 1944–1945
- Powell, 1945–1946
- R.C. Beemon, 1946–1947
- Benjamin A. Barringer, 1947–1958
- B.R. Oliver, 1958–1959
- George Durr, 1959–1966
- Conrad Sloan, 1966–1972
- Duane Linker, 1972–1976
- H.S. Parker, 1976–1985
- Tom Hagar, 1985–1991
- Rick Scroggs, 1991–1994
- Brenda Johnson, 1994–2002
- Martha Brown, 2002–2004
- Dan Osgood, 2004–2007
- Wyonia Chevis, 2007–2010
- Eric Steimel, 2010–2019
- Dana Sutherland, 2019–2023
- Todd Carver, 2023–present
