= California Assessment of Student Performance and Progress =

State standardized test

The California Assessment of Student Performance and Progress (CAASPP), known until February 2014 as the Measurement of Academic Performance and Progress (MAPP), measures the performance of students undergoing primary and secondary education in California. In October 2013, it replaced the Standardized Testing and Reporting (STAR) Program.

== Components ==
CAASPP includes four components:

- Smarter Balanced Summative Assessments (SBAC)
- California Alternate Assessment (CAA)
- California Science Test (CAST)
- California Alternate Assessment (CAA) for Science
- California Spanish Assessment (CSA)

The Smarter Balanced Summative Assessments cover English language arts (ELA) and mathematics for third grade through eighth grade in addition to eleventh grade. CAA tests are the equivalent of Smarter Balanced Summative Assessments for "students with the most significant cognitive disabilities" who are therefore unable to take the Smarter Balanced Summative Assessments.

CAST tests are the state's science tests that are to be taken in fifth grade, eighth grade, and once in high school (tenth, eleventh, or twelfth grade). The CAAs for Science are the equivalent of the CASTs for "students with the most significant cognitive disabilities" who are therefore unable to take the CASTs.

CSA tests are optional Spanish tests that can be taken from third grade through twelfth grade by "students who are seeking a measure to recognize their Spanish-specific reading, writing mechanics, and listening skills"; students do not have to be enrolled in any Spanish course to take the CSAs.

== Operation ==
Each spring, California students in grades 3 through 8 and 11 must take a series of tests that comprise the state's CAASPP program. These must be completed between January 20 and June 30 as of 2026. The California Standards Tests (CSTs) are designed to match the state's academic content standards for each grade. All grades are given English language arts and mathematics. Science tests are added for grades 5, 8, and 11.

== Related tests ==
The California Achievement Test, Sixth Edition (CAT/6), shows how well students are doing compared to students nationally in reading, language, spelling, and mathematics in grades 3 and 7 only.

California's school accountability system was originally based solely on scores from the CAT/6. Through the Academic Performance Index (API), the scores drove the allocation of millions of dollars in intervention and award programs, depending on the health of the state’s budget. (The state has not funded award or intervention programs based on 2002 or 2003 test scores.)

APIs now include results primarily from the California Standards Tests plus CAT/6. Results from the California High School Exit Exam (CAHSEE), taken by 10th graders in the 2001-02 school year, are part of high school APIs. English/language arts scores count for 10% and math for 5%.

The Golden State Exams provide an opportunity for graduating students to earn a distinction of merit on their high school diploma. To save testing time, these examinations will be combined with the high school California Standards Tests.

== History ==
=== Background ===
The STAR Program was the cornerstone of the California Public Schools Accountability Act of 1999 (PSAA). The primary objective of the PSAA is to help schools improve the academic achievement of all students.

From the 1970s, California students took the same statewide test, called the California Assessment Program (CAP). Many districts required additional tests, such as CTBS (California Test of Basic Skills) during that time. In 1990, CAP was replaced by CLAS (California Learning Assessment System), which was discontinued in 1994 because of controversy over portions of the test. Each school district continued to use their own tests known as the High School Competency Exams which had been established as a high school graduation requirement pursuant to California law in 1978. Although not statewide tests, the High School Competency Exams had to conform to state prescribed rules of content and reporting. These tests filled school accountability requirements until the STAR (Standardized Testing and Reporting) program began in 1998. Under this program almost all students in grades 2 through 11 took the California Standards Test that reflect the state's academic content standards and a standardized test every year. Each school must report individual students' scores to their parents, and group results were released in mid-August.

=== Development ===
The legislature reauthorized the STAR Program during 2002, and the SBE selected the California Achievement Tests, Sixth Edition Survey (CAT/6 Survey) to replace the Stanford 9 as the national norm-referenced test for the STAR Program beginning with the spring 2003 test administration. The SBE also authorized the development of the California Alternate Performance Assessment (CAPA), an individually administered assessment for students with significant cognitive disabilities whose disabilities precluded them from taking the CSTs and CAT/6 Survey even with modifications. The CAPA assessed the California ELA, mathematics, and science content standards that were identified as appropriate for students with significant cognitive disabilities. The CAPA was first administered during spring 2003.

In August 2004, Governor Arnold Schwarzenegger signed legislation reauthorizing the STAR Program through 2011. The reauthorized program reduced the CAT/6 Survey to grades three and seven.

During 2005, the SBE designated the Aprenda: La prueba de logros en español, Tercera edición (Aprenda 3) to replace the SABE/2 as the designated primary language test (DPLT) for the STAR Program. The Standards-based Tests in Spanish (STS) were developed to replace the DPLT and are required for the same population of students who took the DPLT. Those tests were first administered in the spring of 2007 to students in grades two through four, and beginning in 2009, the STS was available for students in grades two through eleven. Students taking the STS are also required to take the CSTs and/or the California Modified Assessment (CMA).

In April 2007, the U.S. Department of Education enacted regulations for an alternate assessment based on modified achievement standards, and in response to the federal regulations the CDE has developed the California Modified Assessment (CMA), an alternate assessment of the California content standards based on modified achievement standards for children with an individualized education program (IEP) who meet the eligibility criteria adopted by the State Board of Education. The CMA includes assessments for ELA, mathematics, and science. Eligible students may take either the CST or the CMA in a subject area; for example, a student in grade five may take the CST for ELA and take the CMA for mathematics and science. The CMA was first administered in the spring of 2008 to students in grades three through five. Beginning in 2011, the CMA was available to students in grades three through eleven.

=== Replacement with CAASPP ===
In March 2013 it was announced that the STAR testing system was set to expire in July 2014, and California would replace STAR tests with more in-depth exams in two years in 2015. These new exams would follow the new Common Core State Standards and have requirements for in-depth essays and projects that students will complete on computers.

AB 484, introduced on September 4, 2013 in the state Legislature, would end the use of STAR tests in math and English for the school year already under way – a year earlier than planned, and introduce the Measurement of Academic Performance and Progress (MAPP) tests, a new test aligned to the National Governors Association and College Board's Common Core Initiative. The bill ended up being overwhelmingly endorsed by the Senate and was expected to pass the assembly. It was passed on September 11, 2013 and signed by the Governor on October 2, 2013.

The MAPP was renamed as the California Assessment of Student Performance and Progress (CAASPP) in emergency regulations effective on February 3, 2014 because "a private company has informed the CDE that it believes the name MAPP may confuse members of the public with evaluation services that they offer." The regulations are in California Code of Regulations (CCR) Title 5, Division 1, Chapter 2, Subchapter 3.75 (5 CCR § 850 et seq.).

== See also ==
- California High School Exit Exam
