= Bitburg Middle-High School =

School in Rhineland-Palatinate, Germany

Location
- Bitburg Airbase; Germany; 49°56′43″N 6°33′54″E

Information
- Type: DoDDS Secondary
- Established: 1956
- Closed: 2017
- School district: Kaiserslautern District
- Colors: Blue and white
- Athletics conference: Division II
- Mascot: Barons (Knight)

Bitburg Middle-High School (generally referred to as BMHS), originally opened in 1956, was part of the Kaiserslautern School District and had a student population of approximately 230 with a faculty of thirty. It was situated in Rhineland-Palatinate, Germany. In the 2013-14 school year, the Bitburg Middle School was integrated into the high school.

Although Bitburg Middle-High School was located at the Bitburg Air Base housing complex, many of the students that attended this school lived at the Spangdahlem Air Base or villages in the surrounding areas. Over the course of the next decade, a new middle/high school would be built at the Spangdahlem Air Base.

Bitburg Middle-High School was a member of the Department of Defense Dependents Schools network. It implemented a Block Scheduling/Seminar schedule during the 1994–1995 school year.

In 2017, Bitburg Middle-High School closed. In preparation for a complete handover of the Bitburg grounds back to German control in 2018, students and faculty moved to Spangdahlem.

== Accreditation ==
Bitburg Middle-High School was fully accredited by AdvancED.

== Technology ==
There were three computer labs and students had access to 12 carrels containing laptop computers. Additionally, there was an intranet in which students could save files to their own server partition.

A wide variety of distance learning courses were offered, including Marine Biology, French, AP Macroeconomics, AP Calculus BC and AP Statistics.

== Advanced classes ==
Bitburg Middle-High School offered many Advanced Placement courses through the College Board program.

== Athletics ==
There was interscholastic competition for boys and girls during these three seasons. All athletes had to abide by the Bitburg HS athletic code. A physical examination each year was required to try out, practice or play. All students had to maintain academic eligibility in order to participate in the athletics program.

=== Fall ===
- Football
- Women's Volleyball Division II 3rd Place 2014, Division II 2nd Place 2015, Division II 1st Place 2016
- Golf
- Cross Country Division II 2nd place women's 2015, 3rd place men's 2015
- Tennis
- Cheerleading – Bitburg had won the Division II European Championships from 2000-2007, 2009 and 2010, and held the longest winning streak for cheer in European history.

=== Winter ===
- Wrestling – won the Division II European Championship in 2001, 2002 and 2012
- Men's Basketball - 2000 Division II European Champions
- Women's Basketball – Won Division II European Championship in 2013 and 2015, Division II 2nd place 2016 and 2017
- Cheerleading

=== Spring ===
- Track & Field- Men's Division II Champions 2012, Women's Division II 2nd Place 2014, Women's Division II 3rd Place 2017
- Women's Softball
- Men's Baseball – Division II European Champions 2009, 2011, 2nd Place 2012, 2016, and 2017
- Men's Soccer
- Women's Soccer - Division II 2nd place 2016

== Extracurricular activities ==
Bitburg offered a various number of clubs for students to join. Each club elected at least one position (Senator) and could select up to six (Secretary, Vice President, President, etc.)

- Freshman Class
- Sophomore Class
- Junior Class
- Senior Class
- National Honor Society *
- German Honors Society *
- Spanish Honors Society *
- German Club
- Spanish Club
- Model United Nations
- National Junior Honor Society
- Yearbook (also offered as class)
- Student Council
- FBLA (Future Business Leader of America)
- JROTC Drill Team

*: Denotes entrance requirement

== Eifel School Systems ==
The following schools fed into Bitburg High School either directly or indirectly:

- Bitburg Elementary School (indirectly)
- Spangdahlem Middle School (directly)
