= Quantico Middle/High School =

Secondary school in Quantico, Virginia

Coordinates: 38.5373°N 77.3328°W

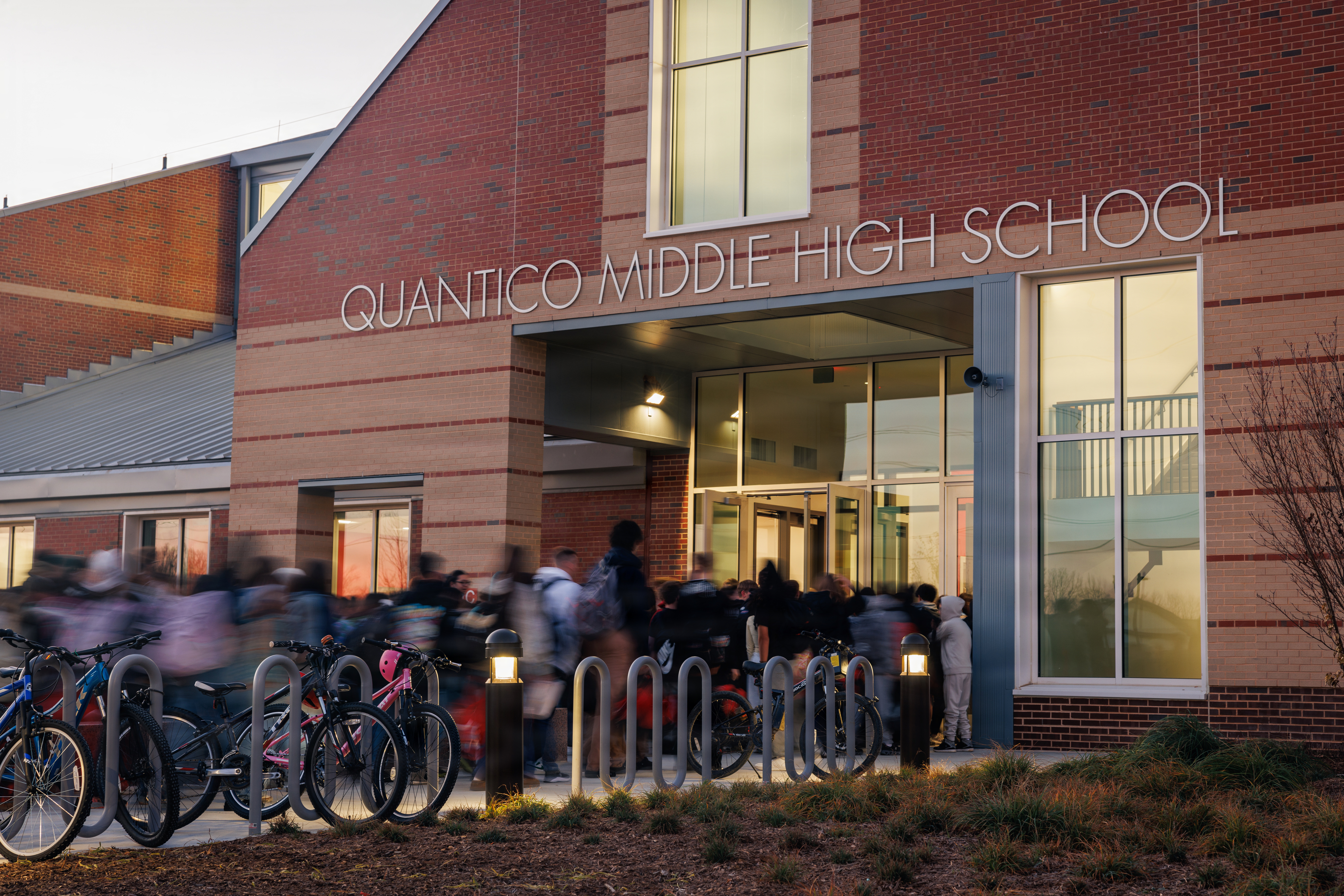
- Quantico Middle/High School students walk into their new building, January 2026

Information
- School board: Department of Defense Education Activity
- Enrollment: ~350 (2020)
- Website: quanticomhs.dodea.edu

Quantico Middle/High School is a public secondary school on Marine Corps Base Quantico, and in unincorporated Prince William County, Virginia. It is a part of the Department of Defense Education Activity (DoDEA).

== History ==
It originated from the Quantico Post School, an elementary through high school on the base. A dedicated secondary school building opened in 1962. The sixth grade was moved to Quantico High in 1988. Quantico Middle School was administratively separated in 1989 with a new separate entrance, but the middle and high schools combined into Quantico Middle High School in 1997.

By 2011, the Department of Defense considered the Quantico Middle/High building to be in "failing" condition. Plans were established for a new building to open in 2015, with a price tag of $44.8 million. Ultimately, the new building opened in 2026.

== Student body ==
Quantico Middle/High School had 300 students enrolled as of 2015, which has led to smaller than average class sizes.

In 2020, it had approximately 350 students.
