= Department of Defense Education Activity =

Global school system operated by US Department of Defense

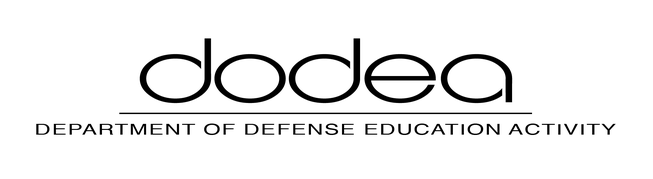

Agency overview
- Formed: 1992
- Preceding agencies: Department of Defense Dependents Schools; Domestic Dependents Elementary and Secondary Schools
- Headquarters: Alexandria, Virginia
- Employees: 15,000
- Annual budget: $3.07B USD (2021)
- Agency executives: Beth Schiavino-Narvaez, Director; Lori Ploessl Pickel, Chief Academic Officer; Robert M. Brady, Chief Operating Officer; Jay Burcham, Chief of Staff
- Parent department: Department of Defense
- Website: dodea.edu

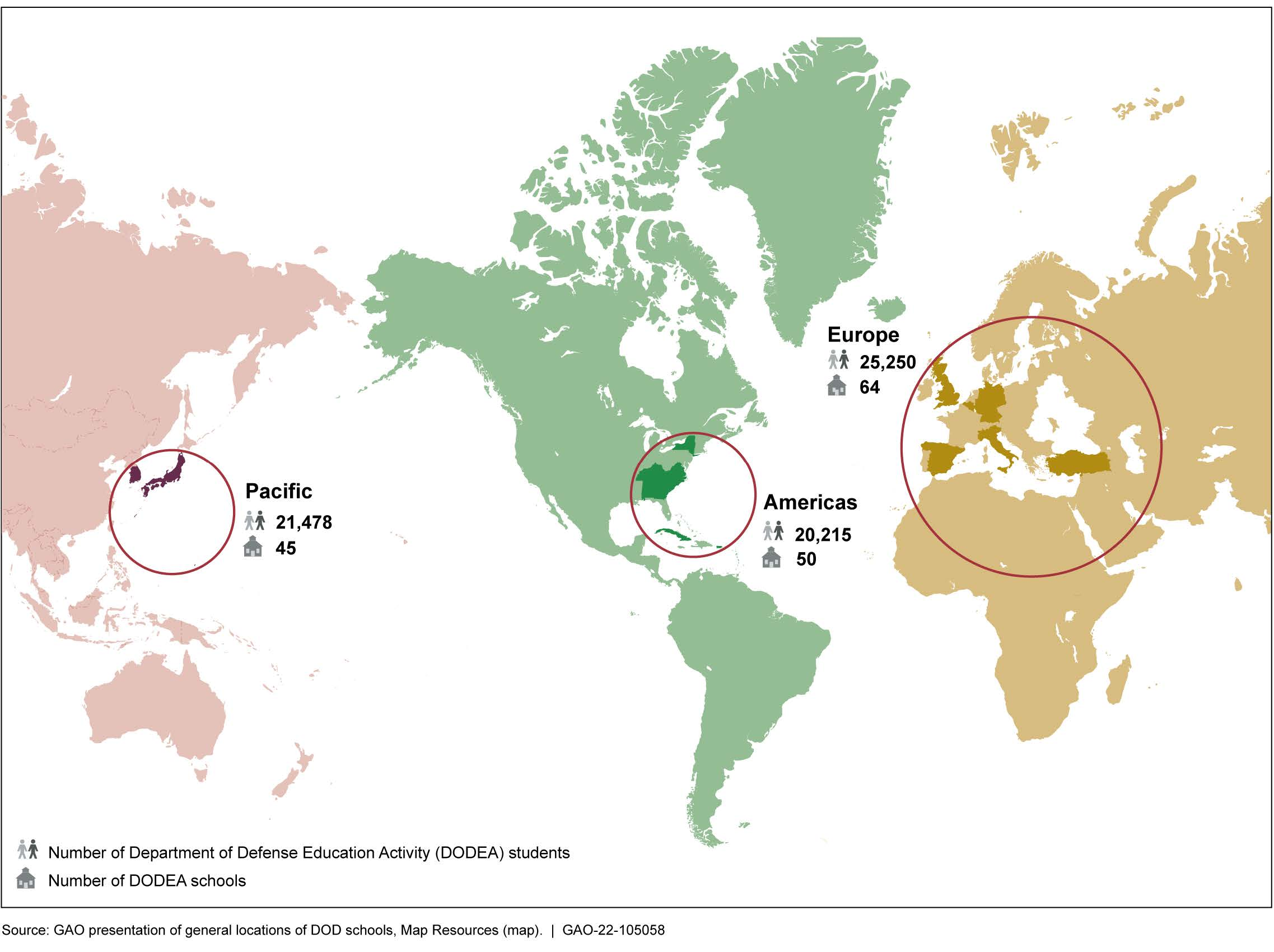
DoD schools and enrollment by region as of 2021

The Department of Defense Education Activity (DoDEA), also referred to as the Department of War Education Activity (DoWEA), (Note: In September 2025, Executive Order 14347 authorized the usage of "Department of War" as a secondary name, which is now preferred by the department. "Department of Defense" remains the statutory name. The secretary of defense may institute a new seal with the approval of the president, without Congress's approval.) is a federal school system headquartered in Alexandria, Virginia, responsible for planning, directing, coordinating, and managing prekindergarten through 12th grade educational programs on behalf of the United States Department of Defense (DoD). DoDEA operates 163 accredited schools in eight districts located in 11 countries, seven U.S. states, Guam, and Puerto Rico.

DoDEA employs 15,000 employees who serve 71,000 children of active duty military and DoD civilian families. DoDEA has also historically served children of non-military and non-government affiliated families and continues to this day with admitting local students even in international locations.

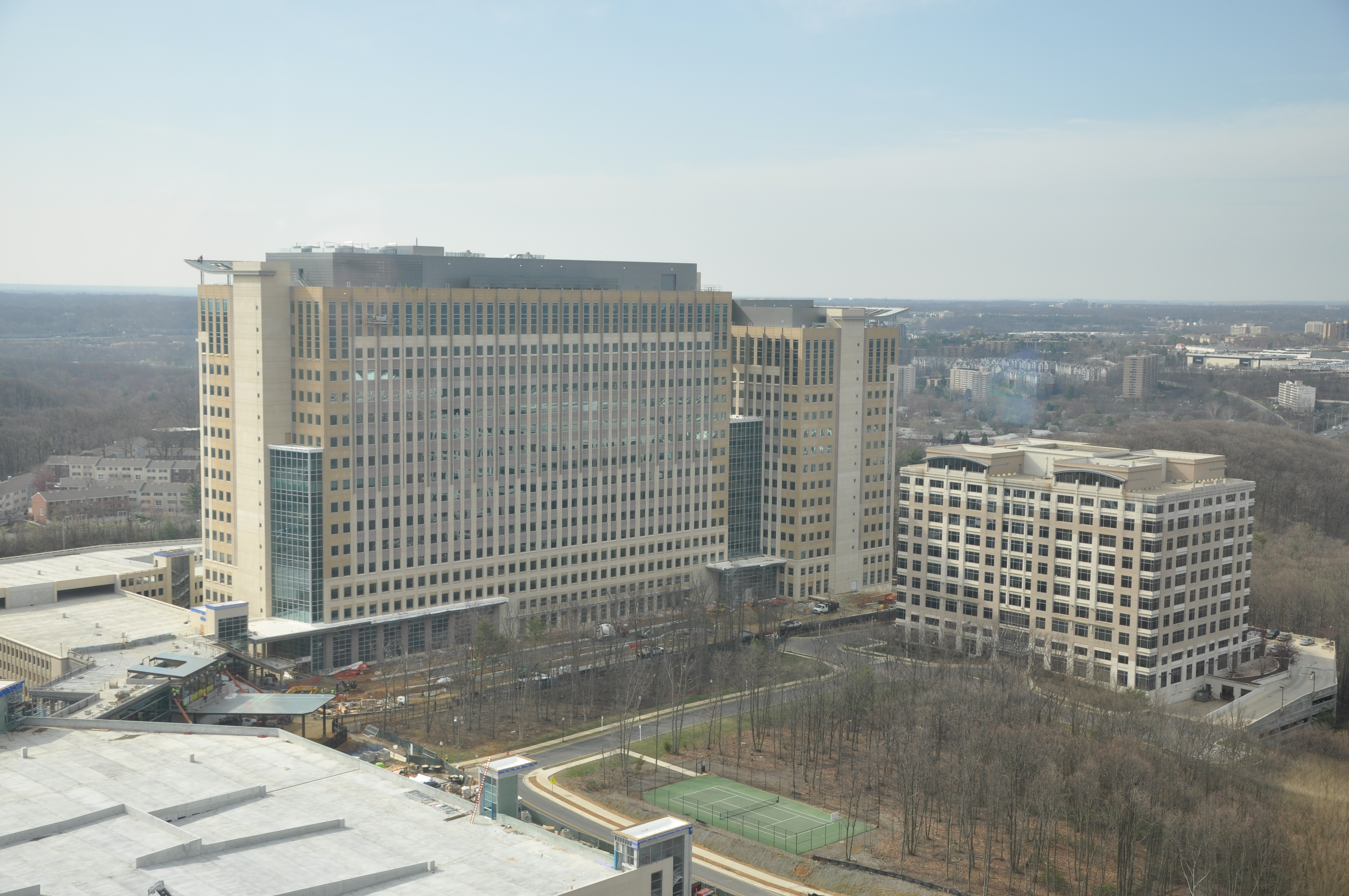
DoDEA's headquarters at the Mark Center in Alexandria, Virginia (left)

DoDEA operates as a field activity of the Office of the Secretary of Defense (Personnel and Readiness). It is headed by a director who oversees all agency functions from DoDEA headquarters in Alexandria. DoDEA's schools are divided into 3 geographic areas: Europe, the Pacific, and the Americas.

It is one of two U.S. federal government school systems, along with the Bureau of Indian Education (BIE).

== History ==
Shortly after the end of World War II, the United States military established schools for the children of its servicemembers stationed in Europe and the Pacific. Schools for children of military members stationed at various bases in the United States were already well-established. First administered by the military branches they served, the growing number of schools was soon transferred to civilian managers, then organized into two separate but parallel systems: the Department of Defense Dependents Schools (Pacific and Europe) overseas, and the Department of Defense Domestic Dependent Elementary and Secondary Schools (Americas) in the United States. In 1994 the two systems were brought together under an umbrella agency, the Department of Defense Education Activity (DoDEA). Shortly thereafter, the DoDEA logo was created by DoDEA Art Director, Calvin Bohner, in 1998.

== Activities ==
The DoDEA instructional program provides a prekindergarten through 12th grade curriculum. Currently 100% of DoDEA schools are accredited and in good standing with their regional accrediting agency. Students consistently achieve high scores in the National Assessment of Educational Progress and above the national average on standardized assessments. Minority students have been especially successful, scoring at or near the highest in the United States in mathematics.

DoDEA measures student progress with multiple performance-based assessments. The TerraNova standardized test provides DoDEA with results that it can compare to a nationwide sample. DoDEA students also take the National Assessment of Educational Progress (NAEP), which provides comparisons of student achievement in reading, writing, math, and science. All DoDEA schools are accredited by the North Central Association Commission on Accreditation and School Improvement (NCA CASI) or the Southern Association of Colleges and Schools Council on Accreditation and School Improvement (SACS CASI), which provide each school with an independent evaluation.

Schools submit annual reports of data, and every five years they host an on-site validation visit led by education experts from the United States. Following the on-site visits, the experts send a report that includes recommendations for improvements to each of the schools visited. DoDEA conducts internal monitoring of educational programs to ensure high-quality implementation of new programs and overall effectiveness of existing programs. Monitoring activities may include, but are not limited to the following activities: surveys, interviews, focus groups, classroom observations and the analysis of achievement and training data. Currently 100% of DoDEA schools are accredited and in good standing.

== Operations ==
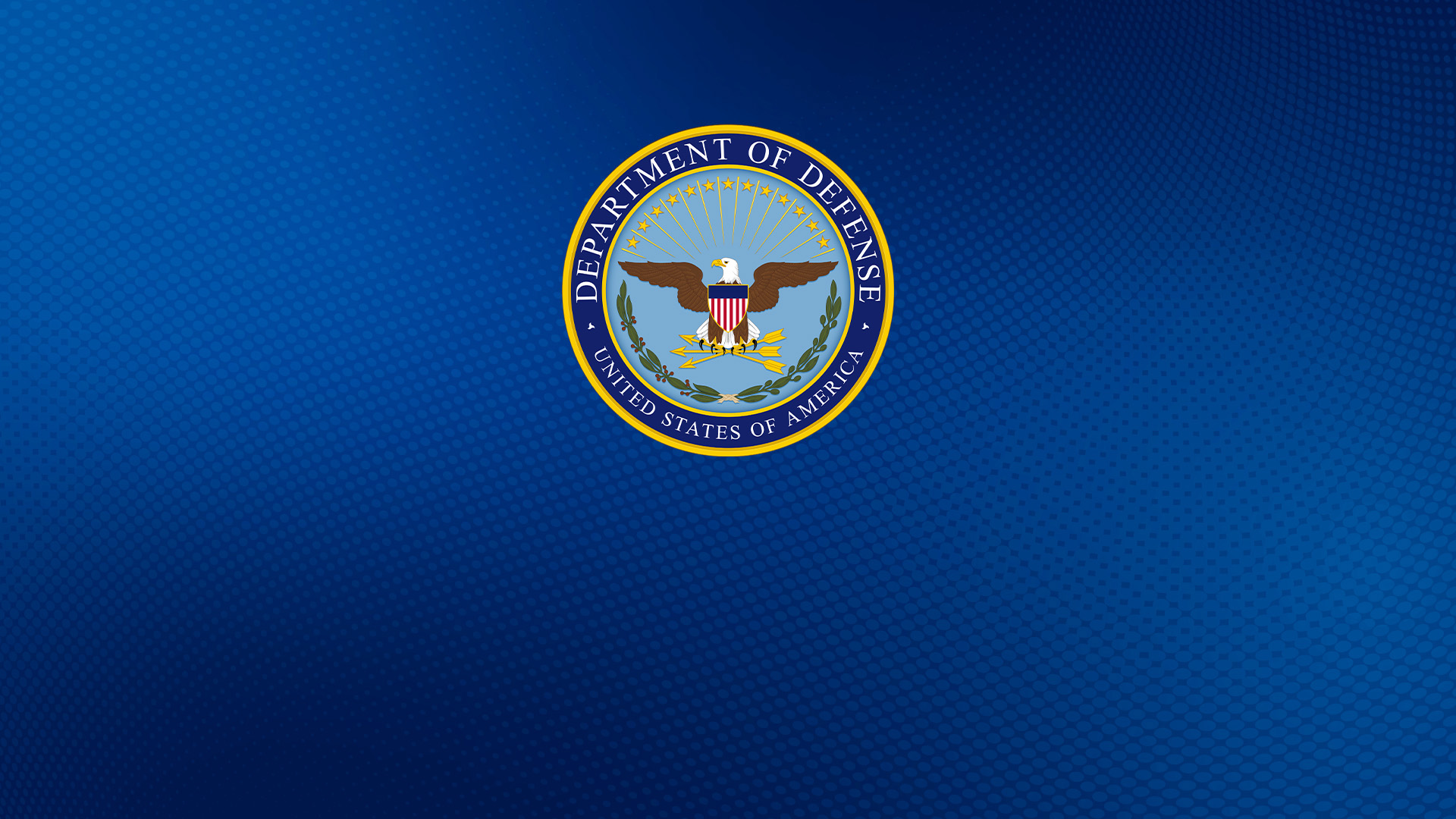
The Department of Defense Education Activity operates under the umbrella of the Department of Defense

In 2008 the U.S. Congress published a study stating that decreased military budgets resulted in 70% of the DoDEA schools having campuses in less than ideal physical condition, with their conditions specifically noted as either "poor" or "failing".

A 2015 editorial of the Minneapolis Star-Tribune noted that schools in the DoDEA, were well funded, partly due to post-September 11 attacks security concerns and partly because of the size of the DOD itself, as well as the leadership of Robert Gates, who served as the Secretary of Defense. The Star-Tribune contrasted this with the lesser-funded Bureau of Indian Education (BIE) network, also federal and serving Native American students.

Sarah Mervosh of The New York Times, citing National Assessment of Educational Progress scores and performance levels of racial minorities, wrote in 2023 that DoDEA campuses "quietly achieve results most educators can only dream of." The nature of military employment means that students have parents with jobs and support structures, and according to Mervosh, the DoDEA campuses are "well-funded, socioeconomically and racially integrated, and have a centralized structure that is not subject to the whims of school boards or mayors." That year, David Leonhardt, also of The New York Times, wrote that the DoDEA "has been performing well for years and continued to do so during" the COVID-19 pandemic.

On February 7, 2025 the DoDEA issued a statement that it would be removing "books potentially related to gender ideology or discriminatory equity ideology topics" in its schools, resulting in a list of titles to be reviewed that include The Kite Runner, An Indigenous Peoples' History of the United States, and Brave New World.

== Academic achievement ==
In 2001 the Government Accountability Office (GAO) wrote "The academic achievement of DOD students, as measured by their performance on standardized tests and their plans for enrolling in college, generally exceeds that of elementary and secondary students nationwide. On college admission tests, DOD students score at or near national averages."

== DoDEA Americas Region ==
Headquartered in Peachtree City, Georgia, in the Atlanta metropolitan area, DoDEA Americas is divided into 2 school districts (Americas Mid-Atlantic and Americas Southeast) and operates 51 schools at 16 military communities on the U.S. mainland, Puerto Rico, and Cuba. As of May 2019, it educates approximately 22,000 students of U.S. military and eligible DoD civilian personnel families.

=== DoDEA Americas' Mid-Atlantic District ===
==== Marine Corps Base Camp Lejeune, NC ====
- Bitz IS
- Brewster MS
- Heroes ES
- Johnson PS
- Lejeune HS
- Tarawa Terrace ES

(note DeLalio ES is at MCAS New River)

==== Fort Bragg, NC ====
- Albritton MS
- Bowley ES
- Devers ES
- Gary Ivan Gordon ES - In the Linden Oaks area
- Hampton PS
- Irwin IS
- Poole ES
- Randall David Shughart ES - In Linden Oaks
- Shughart MS - In Linden Oaks

High school students attend local public schools based on what county they reside in: Cumberland County Schools for Cumberland County residents, and Hoke County Schools for Hoke County residents. The Cumberland County parts are assigned to EE Smith High School.

The Linden Oaks area is in Harnett County Schools, and is assigned to Overhills High School.

==== Marine Corps Air Station New River, NC ====
- DeLalio ES

Brewster Middle School and Lejeune High School in Camp Lejeune serve the community for secondary school.

==== Naval Surface Warfare Center Dahlgren Division, VA ====
- Dahlgren ES/MS
  - The school first opened in 1921. The school's principal facility was built during World War II. In 2011 a review of the building found that it was in "poor" shape.

King George County Public Schools operates non-DoDEA public schools in King George County. Most off-post persons associated with NSF Dahlgren send their children to King George County schools. King George High School is the local county high school.

==== Marine Corps Base Quantico, VA ====
- Crossroads ES
  - The 129,577-square-foot (12,038.1 m^{2}) facility was scheduled to open in Spring 2016. It had a cost of $47 million. It has a two-story media center and a rooftop environmental science center, patio, and garden. The facility uses natural light and heating from geothermal sources. In 2015 the Star-Tribune described it as "state-of-the-art school design". It replaced Ashurst, Burrows, and Russell elementary schools in Quantico.
- Quantico MS/HS

==== USMA West Point, NY ====
- West Point ES
- West Point MS

The academy is physically in the Highland Falls Central School District. The military installation sends students to James I. O'Neill High School of Highland Falls for high School, under contract. Pre-school through 8th grade attend school on the military academy grounds. The elementary school and the middle school are part of the DoDEA system, not in the Highland Falls School District. In 2021, 190 high school children living on post attended James I O'Neill High School. In 2021 the agency at West Point announced that the bid to educate West Point High School students would be competitive. In March 2022 the O'Neill contract was renewed.

==== Guantanamo Bay Naval Station, Cuba ====
- W.T. Sampson ES/HS

==== Coast Guard Air Station Borinquen, PR ====
- Ramey Unit School ES/MS/HS

==== Fort Buchanan, PR ====
- Antilles ES
- Antilles MS
- Antilles HS

=== DoDEA Americas' Southeast District ===
==== Fort Benning, GA ====
- Dexter ES
- Faith MS
- McBride ES
- Stowers ES
- White ES

High school students attend local public high schools operated by countywide school districts. The portion in Muscogee County is zoned to high schools of Muscogee County Schools. The portion in Chattahoochie County is zoned to Chattahoochee County Schools. Off-base families attend county school systems, with residents of Georgia attending those systems, and Alabama residents being in Lee County Schools and Russell County Schools.

==== Fort Campbell, KY ====
- Barkley ES
- Barsanti ES
- Fort Campbell HS
- Lucas ES
- Mahaffey MS
- Marshall ES

The high school first opened in 1962. The current high school building was dedicated in 2018. Of the students, the percentage who attend for all four years total at FCHS is 10.

There were plans for a new middle school, but in 2019 the funds were instead designated for a wall along the Mexico-United States border.

==== Fort Jackson, SC ====
The DoDEA schools on-post for Fort Jackson are Pierce Terrace Elementary School (Pre-Kindergarten through Grade 1) and C.C. Pinckney Elementary School (grades 2–6). Students are zoned to non-DoDEA schools for secondary school: Dent Middle School and Richland Northeast High School, which are operated by Richland County School District Two.

==== Fort Knox, KY ====
- Fort Knox Middle High School
- Scott Intermediate School
- Van Voorhis ES
- Kingsolver ES

==== Fort Rucker, AL ====
- Ellis D. Parker Elementary School

Students beyond the elementary level may attend non-DoDEA schools for secondary levels, with an on-post family choosing one of the following three options: Daleville City School System, Enterprise City School System, or Ozark City Schools. Enterprise operates Enterprise High School and Ozark operates Carroll High School.

==== Fort Stewart, GA ====
- Diamond ES
- Kessler ES
- Murray ES

Students at the secondary level on Fort Stewart attend public schools operated by county school districts. Liberty County School District operates the public schools in Liberty County.

==== Maxwell Air Force Base, AL ====
- Maxwell AFB ES/MS Magnet

In August 2019, of the children who were dependents of military families attached to Maxwell AFB who were enrolled in public schools, 18.03% attended the DoDEA school. In May 2019, residents of the MaxWell FamCamp, previously only zoned to Montgomery Public Schools, now became allowed to send their children to the DoDEA school zone. There was previously a policy that stated that FamCamp residents were not allowed to use the DoDEA school.

For high school residents are zoned to Montgomery Public Schools facilities: residents of the main base are zoned to George Washington Carver High School, while residents of the Gunner Annex are zoned to Dr. Percy L. Julian High School. Residents may attend magnet schools. By 2019, the Autauga County Schools and Elmore County Public School System began to allow Maxwell AFB on post families to send their children to their schools. In 2019 Pike Road Schools's board of trustees agreed to allow Maxwell AFB on-post families to send their children to Pike Road High School.

==== Marine Corps Air Station Beaufort, SC ====
- Bolden ES/MS
- Elliott ES

Beaufort County School District operates public high schools serving MCAS Beaufort, and in sum has the highest number of students, of any school system, affiliated with MCAS Beaufort. Battery Creek High School is the zoned public high school for MCAS Beaufort.

== DoDEA Europe Region ==
Headquartered in Kapaun AS, Kaiserslautern, Germany, DoDEA Europe is organized into 3 districts (EU East, EU South, and EU West) and operates 65 schools within 27 U.S. military communities across Europe. As of May 2019, the DoDEA European region educates approximately 27,000 children of U.S. military and eligible DoD civilian personnel families.

=== DoDEA Europe East District ===
==== USAG Ansbach, Germany ====
- Ansbach ES

==== Baumholder Military Community, Germany (USAG Rheinland-Pfalz) ====
- Baumholder MS/HS
- Smith ES

==== Garmisch Military Community, Germany USAG Bavaria ====
- Garmisch ES/MS

==== Grafenwohr/Vilseck Military Community, USAG Bavaria, Germany ====
- Grafenwoehr ES
- Netzaberg ES
- Netzaberg MS
- Vilseck ES
- Vilseck HS

==== Hohenfels Military Community, Germany USAG Bavaria, Germany ====
- Hohenfels ES
- Hohenfels MS/HS

==== Kaiserslautern Military Community (KMC), Germany ====
- Kaiserslautern ES
- Kaiserslautern MS
- Kaiserslautern HS
- Landstuhl ES/MS
- Sembach ES
- Sembach MS
- Vogelweh ES

==== Ramstein AB, Germany (Part of KMC) ====
- Ramstein ES
- Ramstein HS
- Ramstein IS
- Ramstein MS

==== USAG Stuttgart, Germany ====
- Patch ES
- Patch MS
- Robinson Barracks ES
- Stuttgart ES
- Stuttgart HS

==== USAG Wiesbaden, Germany ====
- Aukamm ES
- Wiesbaden HS
- Wiesbaden MS
- Hainerberg ES

=== DoDEA Europe South District ===
==== Ankara American Community, Turkey ====
- Ankara ES/MS/HS

==== Aviano AB, Italy ====
- Aviano ES
- Aviano MS/HS

==== Naval Support Activity Bahrain ====
- Bahrain ES/HS

==== Camp Darby Military Community, USAG Italy ====
- Livorno ES/MS

==== Naval Support Activity Naples, Italy ====
- Naples ES
- Naples MS/HS

==== Naval Air Station Rota, Spain ====
- Rota ES
- Rota MS/HS

==== Moron AB, Seville, Spain ====
- Sevilla ES/MS

==== Sigonella Air Station, Sicily (IT) ====
- Sigonella ES
- Sigonella MS/HS

==== Vicenza Military Community, USAG Italy ====
- Vicenza ES
- Vicenza MS
- Vicenza HS

=== DoDEA Europe West District ===
==== Schinnen Military Community, USAG Benelux, Brunssum, The Netherlands ====
- AFNORTH ES
- AFNORTH MS/HS

==== RAF Alconbury, United Kingdom ====
- Alconbury ES
- Alconbury MS/HS

==== Brussels Military Community, USAG Benelux, Belgium ====
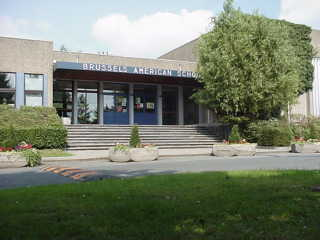
Brussels Elementary High School

- Brussels ES/HS

==== RAF Croughton, United Kingdom ====
- Croughton ES

==== Kleine Brogel Air Base, USAG Benelux Belgium ====
- Kleine Brogel ES

==== RAF Lakenheath, United Kingdom ====
- Feltwell ES
- Lakenheath ES
- Lakenheath HS
- Liberty IS

==== SHAPE Military Community, US Army Garrison Benelux, Mons, Belgium ====
- SHAPE ES
- SHAPE MS
- SHAPE HS

==== Spangdahlem Air Base, Germany ====
- Spangdahlem ES
- Spangdahlem MS
- Spangdahlem HS

== DoDEA Pacific Region ==
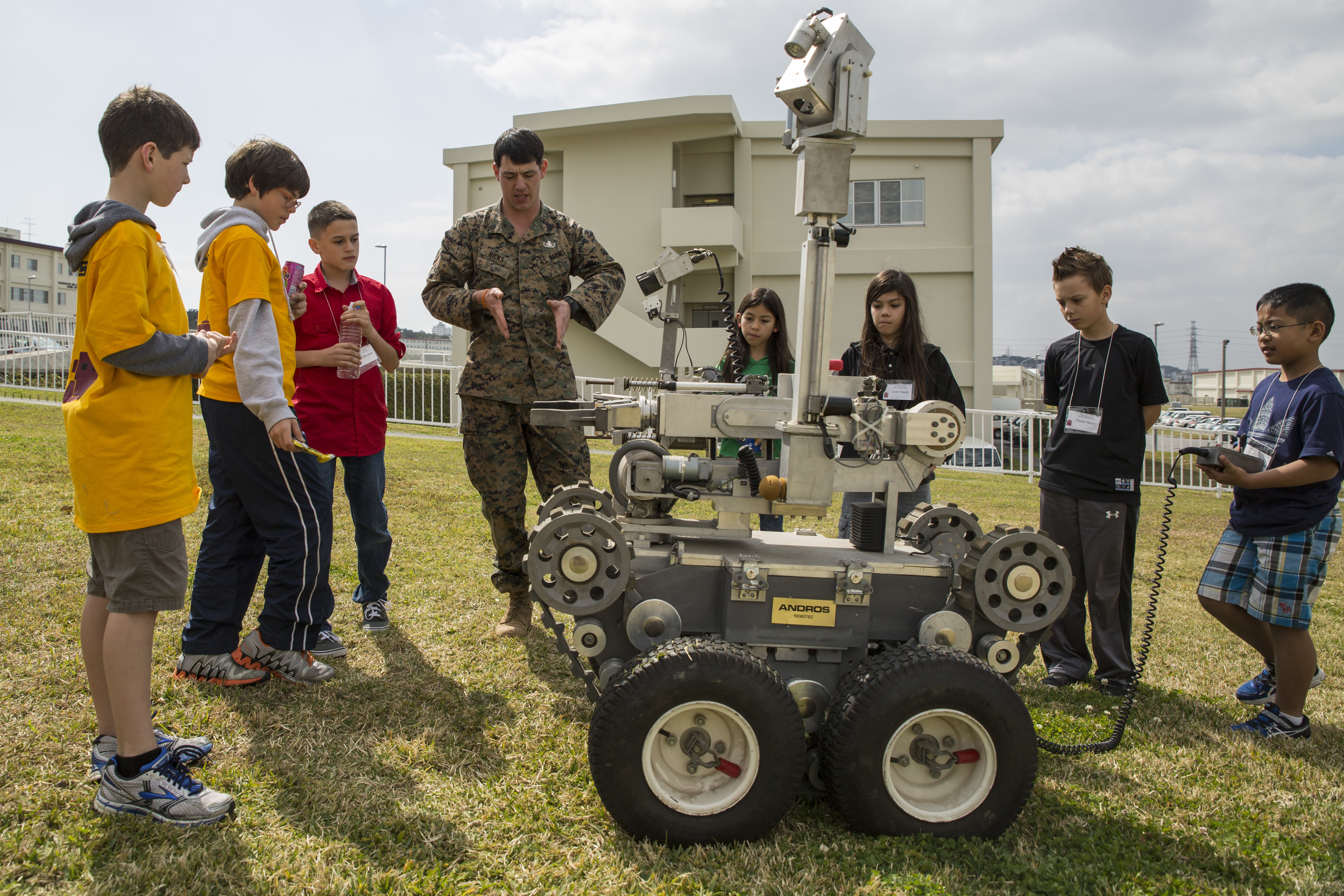
DoDEA students in Okinawa compete in a robotics competition.

Headquartered in Yokota AB, Japan, the DoDEA Pacific region is organized into 3 districts (Pacific East, Pacific South, and Pacific West) and operates 47 schools on 21 U.S. military installations in Guam, Japan, Okinawa and South Korea. As of May 2019, the DoDEA Pacific Region educates over 22,000 children of U.S. military and eligible DoD civilian personnel families.

=== Pacific East District ===
==== Camp Zama, Kanagawa Prefecture, Japan ====
- Arnn American ES
- Zama American MS/HS

==== Commander Fleet Activities Sasebo ====
- Darby ES
- E.J. King MS/HS
- Sasebo ES

==== Commander Fleet Activities Yokosuka ====
- Ikego ES
- Kinnick HS
- Sullivans ES
- Yokosuka MS

==== Marine Corp Air Station Iwakuni ====
- Iwakuni ES
- Iwakuni MS
- M.C. Perry ES
- M.C. Perry HS

==== Misawa Air Base ====
- Edgren MS/HS
- Sollars ES

==== NAF Atsugi ====
- Lanham ES

==== Yokota Air Base ====
- Mendel ES
- Yokota MS
- Yokota HS
- Yokota West ES

=== Pacific South District ===
==== Andersen AFB (Guam) ====
- Andersen ES
- Andersen MS

==== Camp Foster, Okinawa ====
- Killin ES
- Kubasaki HS
- Zukeran ES

==== Camp Kinser, Okinawa ====
- Kinser ES

==== Camp Lester, Okinawa ====
- Lester MS

==== Camp McTureous, Okinawa ====
- Bechtel ES

==== Kadena Airforce Base, Okinawa ====
- Amelia Earhart IS
- Bob Hope PS
- Kadena ES
- Kadena HS
- Kadena MS
- Ryukyu MS

Stearley Heights Elementary School closed in 2021.

==== Naval Base Guam ====
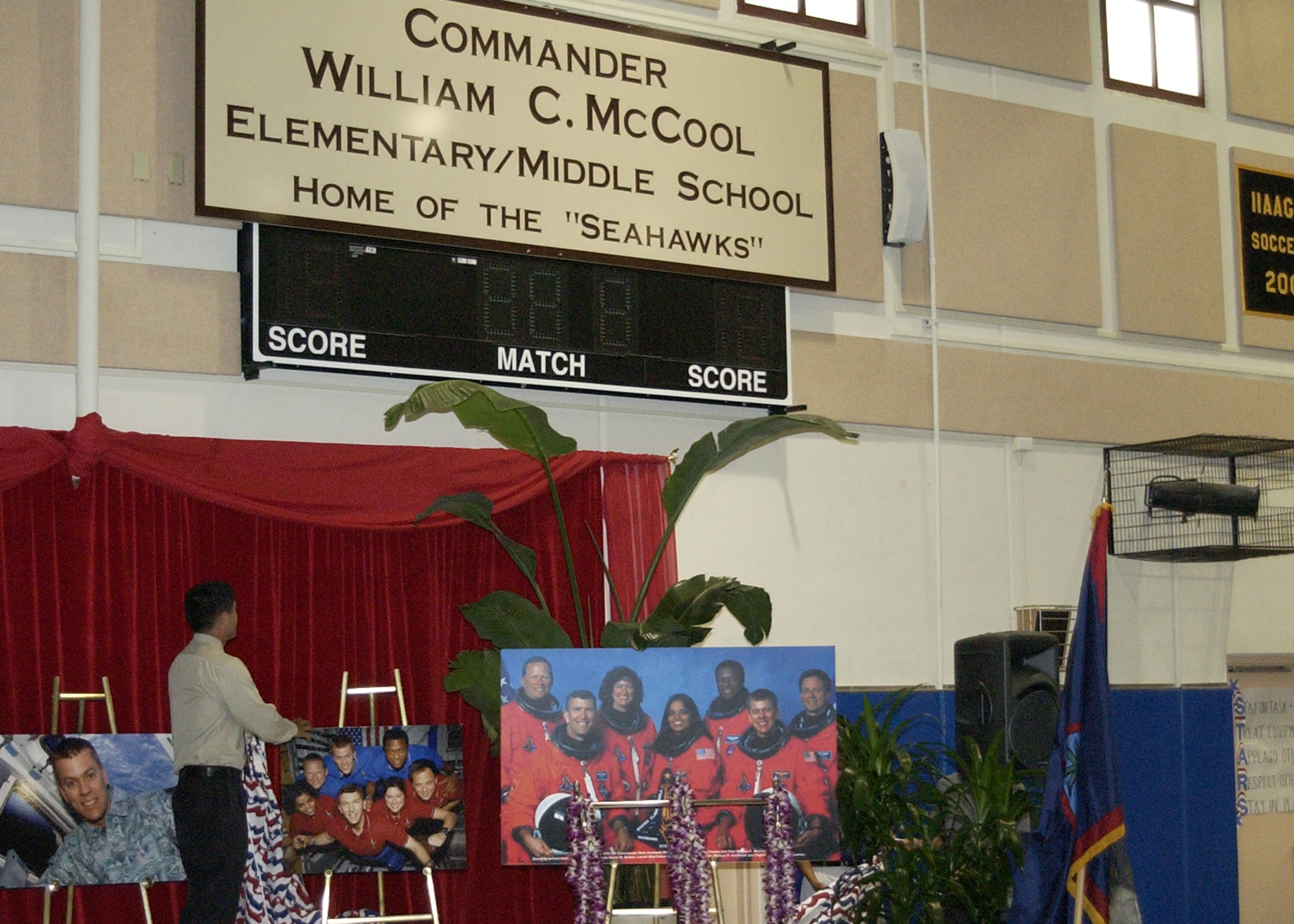
Sean McCool, son of late astronaut William C. McCool, helps unveil a new school sign at DoDEA Guam South School.

- McCool ES/MS

==== U.S. Naval Hospital (Guam) ====
- Guam HS

=== Pacific West District ===
==== Osan Air Base ====
- Osan American ES
- Osan American MS/HS

Osan American Middle High School formed in 2017 with the consolidation of the middle and high schools. In September 2017 it had 320 students.

==== US Army Garrison Daegu – Camp George ====
- Daegu American ES

==== US Army Garrison Daegu – Camp Walker ====
- Daegu MS/HS

Daegu Middle High School formed in 2017 with the consolidation of the middle and high schools. In September 2017 it had 299 students.

==== US Army Garrison Humphreys ====
- Humphreys Central ES
- Humphreys West ES
- Humphreys MS
- Humphreys HS

== Former schools ==
Iceland

- AT Mahan High School (Keflavik)
- AT Mahan Elementary School (Keflavik)

Panama

- Balboa HS
- Curundu ES
  - On Fort Clayton, it operated from 1968 to 1999.
- Curundu MS
- Fort Clayton ES
- Fort Kobbe ES
- Howard ES

Philippines

- Wagner High School (Clark Air Base)

South Korea

- Seoul American High School
- Seoul Elementary School
- Pusan Elementary/High School
- Joy Elementary School

United Kingdom

- London Central Elementary High School (formerly London Central High School)
- West Ruislip Elementary School

== See also ==
- Department of Defense Dependents Schools
- List of schools in United States territories
- Yellowstone Park School - A school on Yellowstone National Park that existed from 1921 to 2008; it was federally funded from 1949 to 2008.
