= Kaiserslautern High School =

American military secondary school in Kaiserslautern, Rhineland-Palatinate, Germany

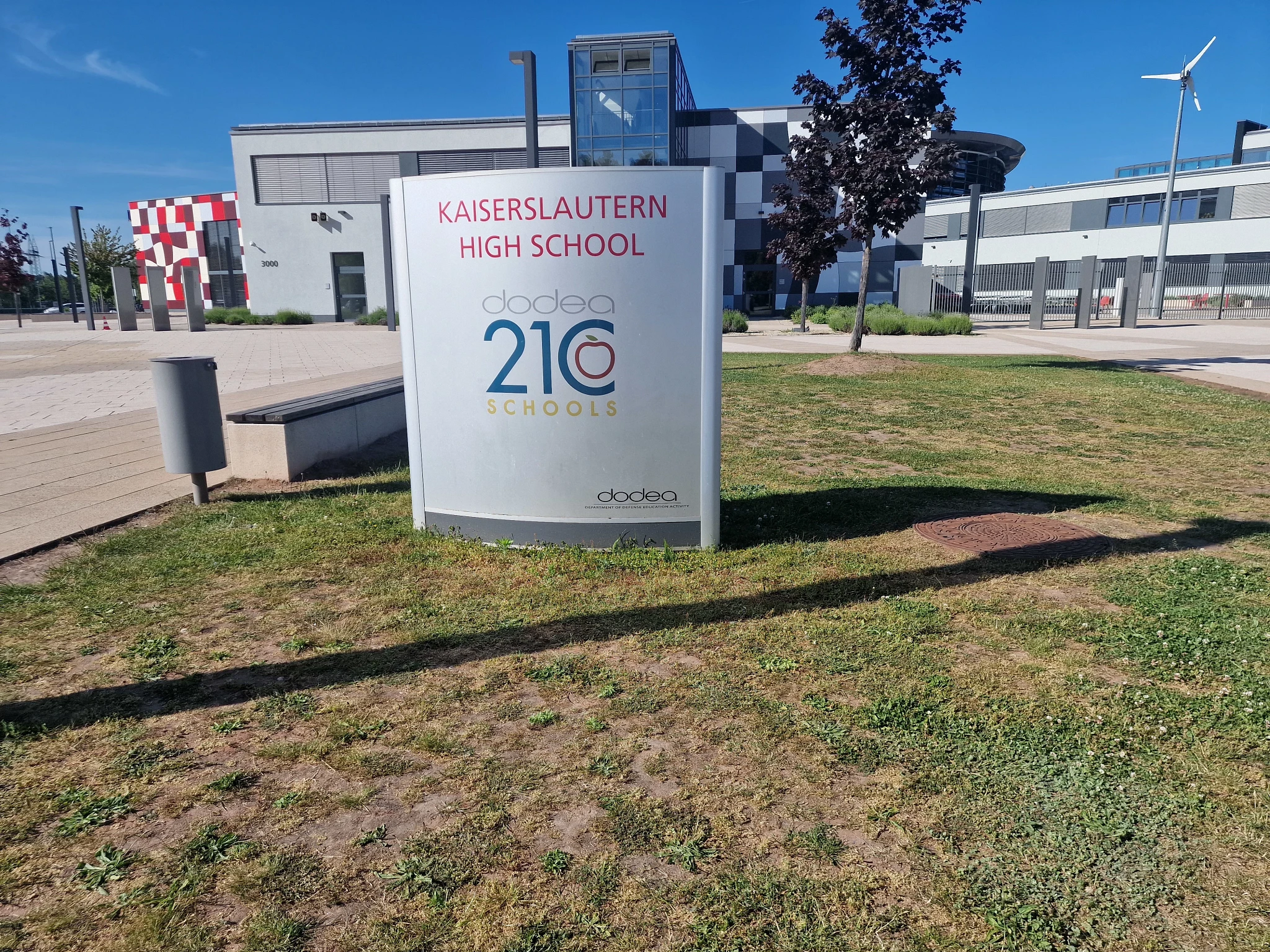
- Kaiserslautern, Rhineland-Palatinate; Germany

Information
- Type: DoDEA Secondary
- Established: March 12, 1953 (73 years ago)
- CEEB code: 576220
- Principal: Susan Paul
- Faculty: 62
- Teaching staff: 68 (as of 2021)
- Grades: 9–12
- Enrollment: 717 (as of July 2023)
- Colors: Red and white
- Mascot: Raider
- Website: www.dodea.edu/KaiserslauternHS/index.cfm sites.google.com/a/student.dodea.edu/kaiserslautern-high-school/

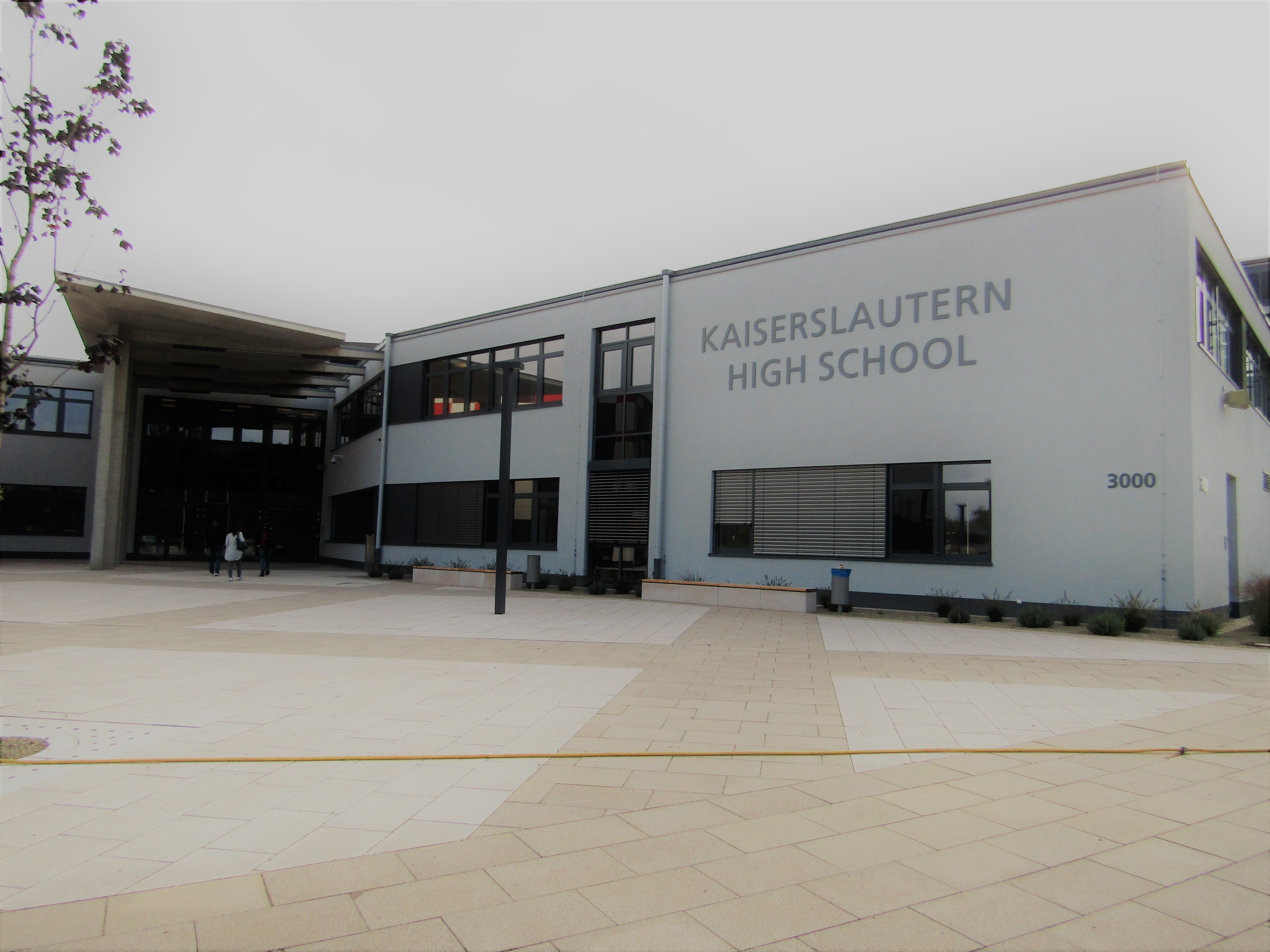
The new school building for Kaiserslautern High School

Kaiserslautern High School (KHS), formerly known as Rhine High School as well as Kaiserslautern American High School, is part of the Department of Defense Education Activity (DoDEA) system for military dependents. KHS, along with Ramstein High School, are two DoDEA schools that serves the Kaiserslautern Military Community (KMC) in Kaiserslautern, Germany. The KMC is home to the largest American population overseas. The school, which serves approximately 800 students with 68 full-time educators (11:1), is located on the Vogelweh Military Complex.

== History ==
Shortly after the development of Western Area Command (WACOM) in 1952, when Americans took over the western area of Germany from the French, KHS was housed in a converted apartment building. On March 12, 1953, the school moved into an old hospital building and expanded over the years.

From 1953 to 1958, the school included a dormitory for approximately 150 French and German students. The school was originally known as Rhine High, not being referred to as Kaiserslautern American High School or "KAHS" until the early sixties. Currently, the school is known as Kaiserslautern High School or "KHS". The school grew quickly, in 1982 KHS (with an enrollment of more than 1600 students) was the largest military-operated high school outside the continental US.

== Governance ==
KHS and all other DoDEA schools were operated by Department of Defense Education Activity (DoDEA) until the department changed names to Department of War Education Activity (DoWEA) in 2026. KHS is part of the Kaiserslautern Military Community Complex in the Europe Central District, one of the four European school districts run by DoWEA. It is one of the largest DoDEA schools by population in Europe.

KHS is fully accredited by the North Central Association for Accreditation (NCAA) and AdvancEd/COGNIA. The school now falls under district accreditation with The Europe Central district. Every five years the school is visited by AdvancEd/COGNIA to assess the success of the school's individual school improvement plan.

In 2012, Barriett Smith replaced Jennifer Beckwith as principal. Smith was replaced by Jackie Ferguson. Ferguson was principal for one year (2019–2020). She was replaced by Jason James, starting in fall 2020. Dr. Susan Paul replaced Jason James as principal beginning June 2023 and retired in July 2026. Dr. Sara Schmidt is the current principal of Kaiserslautern High School as of 1 August 2026.

== Campus ==
KHS has one main building with four different wings radiating from a central area. The school has a gym, a workout/weight room, a tennis court, a softball field, a football stadium, a shooting range for JROTC, and music rooms with practice rooms. The football stadium is also known as Babers Stadium, honoring KHS alum Alonzo Babers. A military dependent and KHS graduate, Babers won two gold medals in track and field events at the 1984 Summer Olympics.

== Demographics ==
- Seniors 128
- Juniors 176
- Sophomores 169
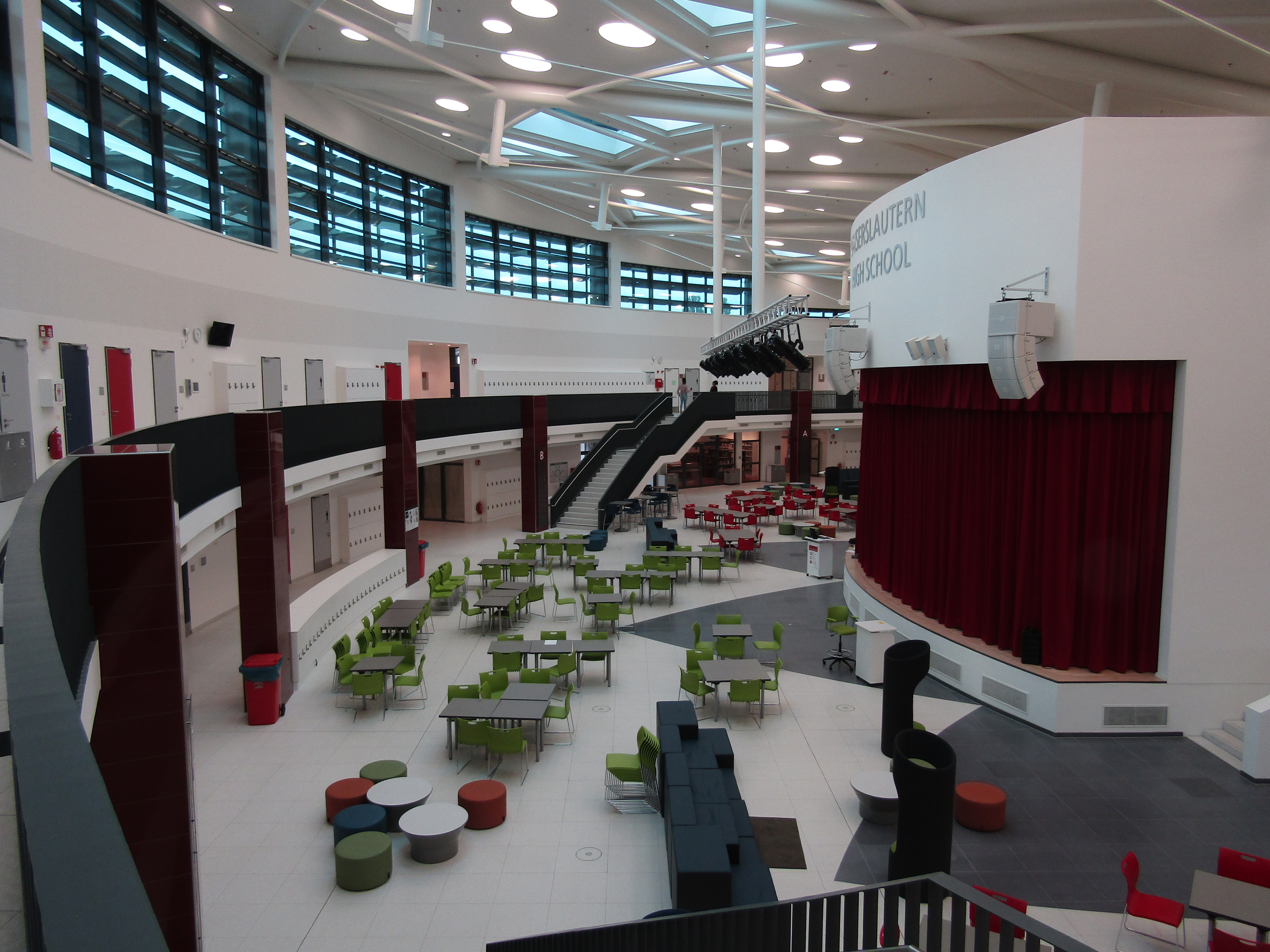
  Kaiserslautern High School Common Area-Stage & Lunch Room
- Freshmen 199
- Staff 72

== Sports ==
During the school year, KHS sports teams compete against schools in the DoWEA Europe East District and other non-DoD related schools.

- Fall season (September – November)
  - Golf (boys, girls)
  - Volleyball (girls)
  - Football (boys, girls)
  - Cross Country (boys, girls)
  - Tennis (boys, girls)
  - Cheerleading (boys, girls)
- Winter season (November – February)
  - Basketball (boys, girls)
  - Cheerleading (boys, girls)
  - Wrestling (boys, girls)
- Spring season (March–May)
  - Soccer (boys, girls)
  - Track and Field (boys, girls)
  - Baseball (boys)
  - Softball (girls)

Some students swim with the Kaiserslautern Kingfish swim team; however, this is not an official KHS team or DoWEA sport. The swim team is run independently of the school.

== Feeding schools ==
- Vogelweh Elementary School
- Kaiserslautern Elementary School
- Landstuhl Elementary School
- Sembach Elementary School
- Kaiserslautern Middle School

== Notable alumni ==
- Alonzo Babers, two-time Olympic gold medalist, winning gold in the 400 meters and the 4 × 400 meters relay at the 1984 Summer Olympics
- Boris Byrd, former football player in the National Football League
- Brett Paesel, actress and author
- Kamiko Williams, former basketball player in the Women's National Basketball Association
