= Alconbury Middle High School =

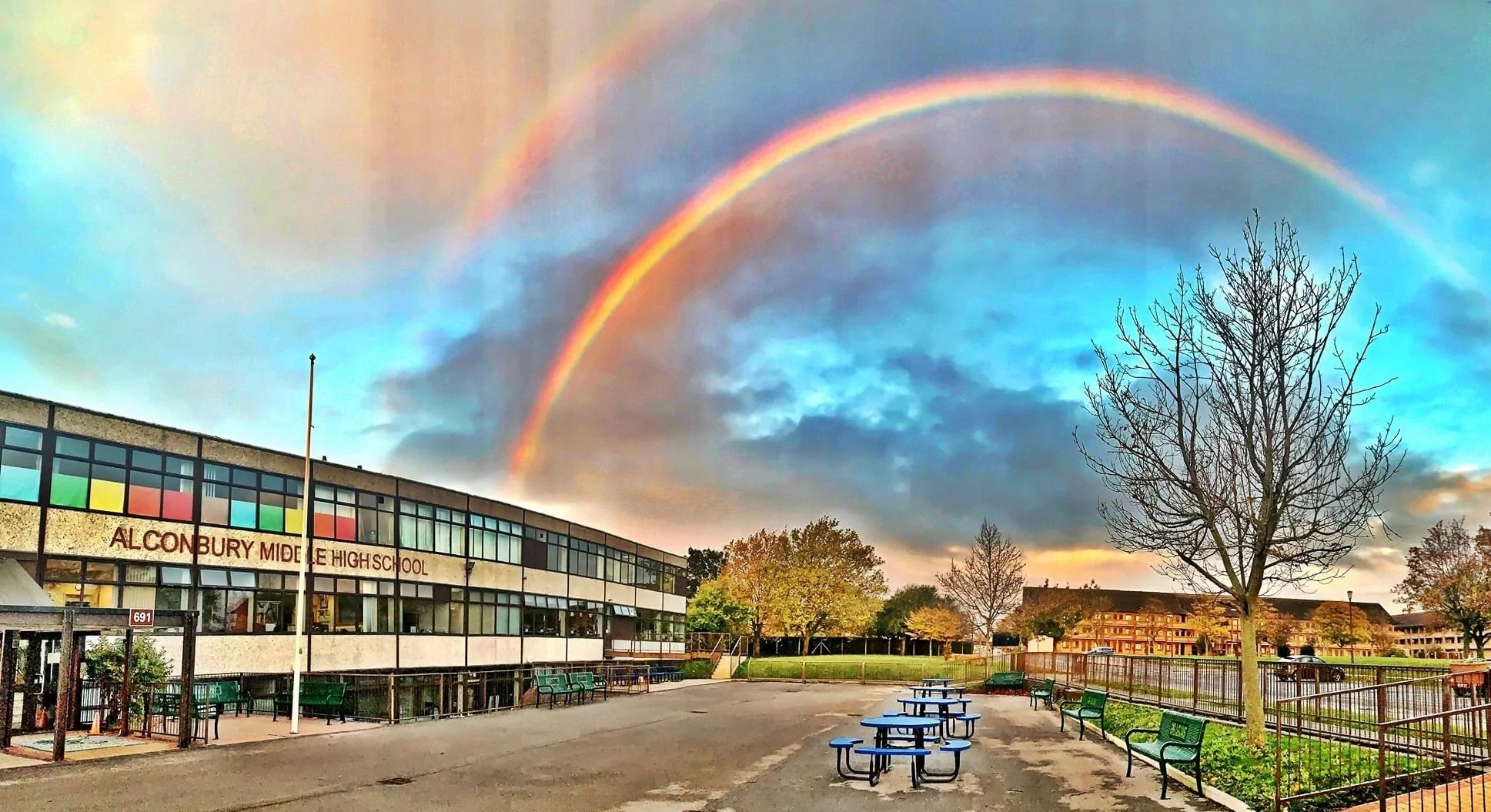

Location
- Alconbury; England; 52.3632°N 0.2154°W

Information
- School type: Public
- Principal: (As of 2025) Ms. Jennifer Seguin
- Years offered: 6–12
- Website: alconburymhs.dodea.edu

Alconbury Middle High School is a publicly funded high school located in RAF Alconbury, England, operated by the Department of Defense Education Activity (DoDEA). It is a U.S. publicly funded school, and all schools within DoDEA are fully accredited by U.S. accreditation agencies. It is not funded by HM Government's Department for Education and is not open to British citizens and British nationals. It mainly serves families of USAF personnel based at RAF Alconbury and RAF Molesworth.

It is one of two DoDEA school communities that still exist for families stationed in the United Kingdom. The other one is located at RAF Lakenheath, and both of these communities are districted as part of the West District of DoDEA Europe. There used to be other American schools in England to support families and their students, but some have closed down, and those students are bussed to nearby school communities. For example, London Central Elementary High School, which officially closed in 2007, had its students transferred to Alconbury Middle High School in the following school year (2007–2008).

== Alconbury Schools Community ==
The Alconbury Schools Community consists of two schools: Alconbury Middle High School (which teaches grades 6–12) and Alconbury Elementary School (which starts as early as Head Start and continues until 5th grade). Both schools work together to support their community of students and families, and as of 2021, still have an updated Facebook to keep everyone notified and up-to-date of current and upcoming school happenings.

== History ==
Originally, Alconbury Elementary and Middle High Schools did not exist. In 1951, the RAF Molesworth School was opened, and it enrolled students from grades 1 to 9. Between the time it opened and the time schools closed on RAF Molesworth, there was Alconbury Elementary, Molesworth Junior High School, and Lakenheath High School. All schools on RAF Molesworth closed in 1974, and the schools were relocated to RAF Alconbury, where they still are today. Students that are stationed at RAF Lakenheath and RAF Mildenhall attend Lakenheath High School, while students whose families are at RAF Alconbury, RAF Molesworth, and other stations nearby, attend the Alconbury Schools Community.

Alconbury Elementary School opened up in 1955, and has since been supporting students from preschool through 6th grade, until the Middle/High School became 6–12th grade in the school year 2008–2009.

Alconbury seniors have been able to have graduation ceremonies in amazing locations. Until 2013, Alconbury students graduated at the Peterborough Cathedral. In 2013, the graduating class was able to have their ceremony at Ely Cathedral.The class of 1988 also had their graduation ceremony there.

== Extra-curriculars offered ==
Just like any other school, there are numerous extra curricular activities offered. Alconbury has a variety of sports teams – such as cheerleading, cross country, volleyball, tennis and football in the fall season; basketball, cheerleading, marksmanship, and wrestling in the winter season; and soccer, softball, baseball, and track in the spring season. All of these sports culminate in their specific Europeans Championship – and they are considered to be a member of the District III teams of DoDEA Europe, due to size of the student population. There has been a drama program most years, as well as a Beginning and Advanced Band. There are both Boy Scout and Girl Scout troops on base that the students are able to participate in, and are able to accomplish their awards (e.g. Eagle Scout and Gold Award) through the school if necessary.

In addition to the usual offerings, being in England has offered some unique opportunities for high school students to participate in, such as the Duke of Edinburgh's Award. In 2005, Sponsor Carol Bilverstone took her team of Silver Award level students Megan Camero and Shastina Crittenden (née Oglesbee) to Slovenia to participate with a group of students there in a Silver Level expedition. The following year, in the spring, the Slovenian students came to the U.K. and joined both Sam and Shastina, as well as students from the RAF Menwith Hill Duke of Edinburgh's Award students for their final Silver Expedition. Unique opportunities like this are available throughout the school year, depending on the resources available.
