= W.T. Sampson Elementary/High School =

School at Guantanamo Bay Naval Base, Cuba

W. T. Sampson High School
- W. T. Sampson High School

Location
- 19.931547°N 75.121624°W

Information
- Type: Public
- Established: 1931 (95 years ago)
- School district: DoDEA
- Principal: Dr. Angelo Barcinas
- Grades: Sure Start–12
- Enrollment: 212
- Student to teacher ratio: 8:1
- Colors: Green and gold
- Team name: Pirates
- Feeder schools: W.T. Sampson Elementary School
- Website: wtsampsonehs.dodea.edu

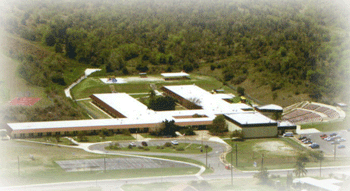
Former Sampson Elementary School

W.T. Sampson Elementary/High School is a K-12 school in Guantanamo Bay Naval Base, Cuba. In 2010 the school had 212 students in two campuses that are 2 miles (3.2 km) apart. As of 2021, all students (K-12) are on the newly constructed campus.

It is operated by the Department of Defense Education Activity of the United States Department of Defense. W.T.S. is the oldest DoDEA school.

As of 2021 currently enrolled in W.T. Sampson High School are 212 students. Students are the children of military and civilian families stationed at Naval Station Guantanamo Bay, Cuba. The school is accredited by the North Central Association of Schools and Colleges (NCA) and has held accreditation since 1931.

== History ==
It is the oldest continually operating Department of Defense school. It opened in 1931, operated by the United States Navy. At the time, the sole staff member was Guantanamo Bay's Protestant chaplain, and the school facility was the chaplain's office. By 1932 the school had over 30 students. When a faculty was assembled, it taught elementary school on mornings and high schools in afternoons.

In 1941 the high school moved to a building on Chapel Hill.

A new W. T. Sampson School was officially dedicated on October 25, 1956. Named after Admiral W. T. Sampson, USN, who during the Spanish–American War headed the U.S. Fleet that operated in the water surrounding Cuba.

During the Cuban Missile Crisis students were evacuated to the mainland United States.

In 1976 the school was incorporated into the United States Department of Defense Education Activity and was no longer directly operated by the Navy. In 1985 the high school moved to its current location.

In 2016, NAVFAC awarded a project to demolish the existing W.T. Sampson school buildings and replace them with a multi-story elementary/middle/high school building that is expected to be finished by November 2018. The price per student would be $250,000, while a typical public school in Miami-Dade County, Florida would have a price of $30,000 per student. Carol Rosenberg of the Miami Herald characterized the new Sampson as "one of the world’s priciest schools". The company that built the school was Munilla Construction Management LLC, a Cuban American concern based in Miami.

This new school was completed and opened to students in Spring of 2021 and is the current location of both the Elementary and High School.

== Academic assessment ==
Students of the DODEA school system are subject to two assessment standards to measure academic performance.

There is the TerraNova that is taken in Grades 3-11. "DoDEA students scored substantially higher than the national average (50th percentile) in all subject areas."

The other test is the SAT. The SAT is not a required test. The participation rate of DoDEA students in 2009 was 67%. The national SAT participation rate was 46%.

=== TerraNova results ===
Subject Matter	9th Grade	10th Grade	11th Grade
Reading	80%	79%	80%
Language	77%	75%	72%
Math	72%	73%	69%
Science	75%	71%	70%
Social Studies	78%	79%	77%

=== SAT results ===
SAT	DoDEA	National Average
Critical Reading	505	501
Math	300	515
Writing	132	493

== Campus ==
Previously, the high school campus was on Chapel Hill. Chapel Hill is the location of the base church. Across from the chapel was a series of offices and classrooms that was the original location for the school from 1931 to 1986.

The prior campus was dedicated in 1986.

The school has been remodeled in recent years. The school has an Information Center, one full-size computer lab, Internet access in all classrooms, and a gymnasium.
