= Kaiserslautern Military Community =

American military community in Germany

- American military community
- Country: Germany
- State: Rhineland-Palatinate
- Established: 20 June 1975 (51 years ago)
- Named for: Kaiserslautern

The Kaiserslautern Military Community (KMC) is an American military community in and around Kaiserslautern, Germany, supporting United States Armed Forces and NATO installations, such as the Ramstein Air Base, Landstuhl Regional Medical Center, Kapaun Air Station, Vogelweh Housing Area, Pulaski Barracks, Kleber Kaserne, Daenner Kaserne, Sembach Kaserne, Miesau Army Depot, and Rhine Ordnance Barracks. With around 54,000 people, including military service members, Department of Defense civilians and contractors as well as their families, the KMC is the largest U.S. military community outside of the United States.

== Police and security ==
569th United States Forces Police Squadron

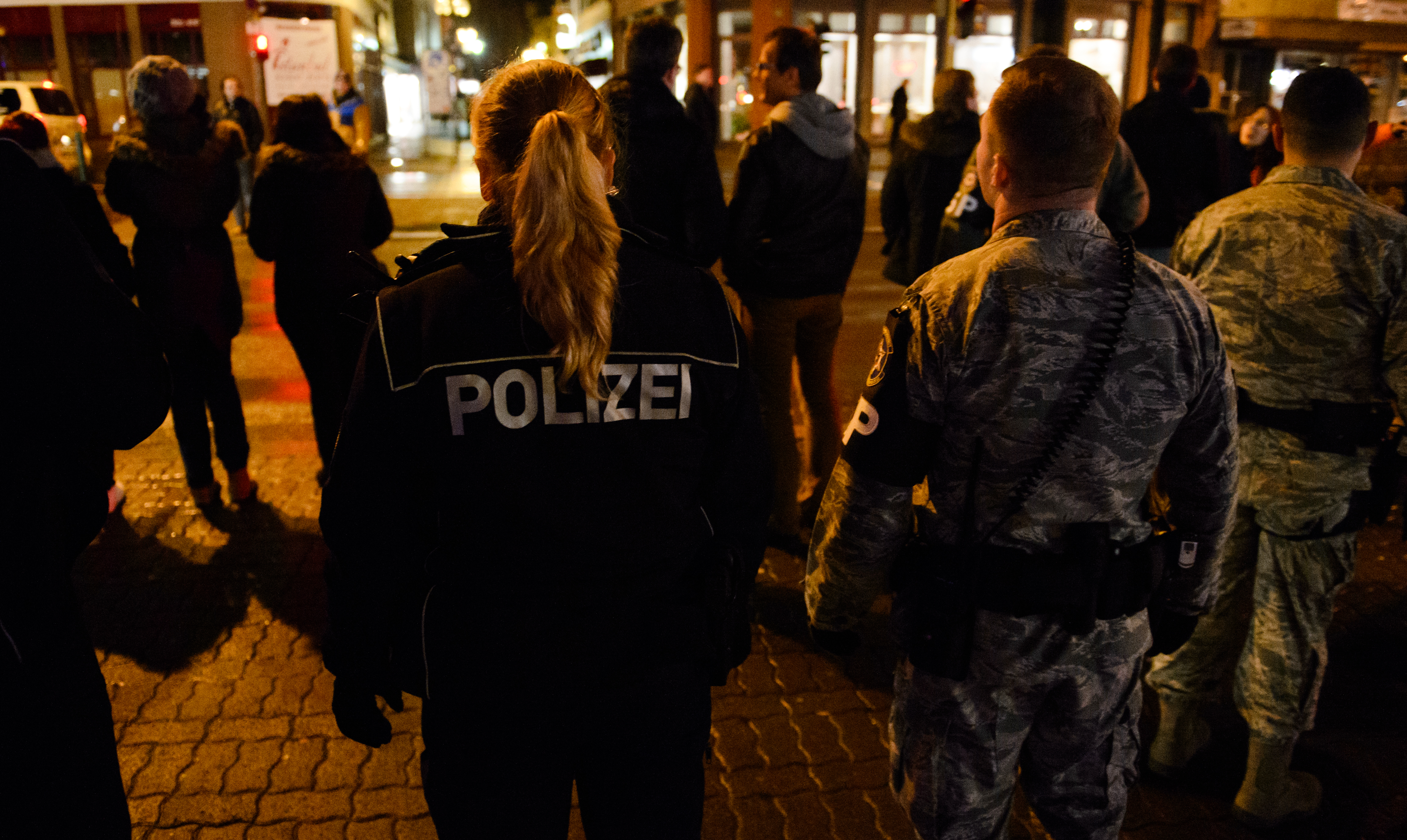
- A member of the 569th USFPS on joint patrol in Kaiserslautern with a German officer of the Rhineland-Palatinate Police in 2015
- Active: 1 February 1952 – 7 April 1952; 15 October 1984 – present
- Country: United States
- Branch: United States Air Force
- Type: Military police
- Part of: United States Air Forces in Europe – Air Forces Africa: Third Air Force; 86th Airlift Wing; 86th Mission Support Group
- Garrison/HQ: Vogelweh Military Complex, Germany
- Nickname: Guardian Eagles
- Motto: To Serve And Protect
- Decorations: Air Force Outstanding Unit Award (12x)

Insignia
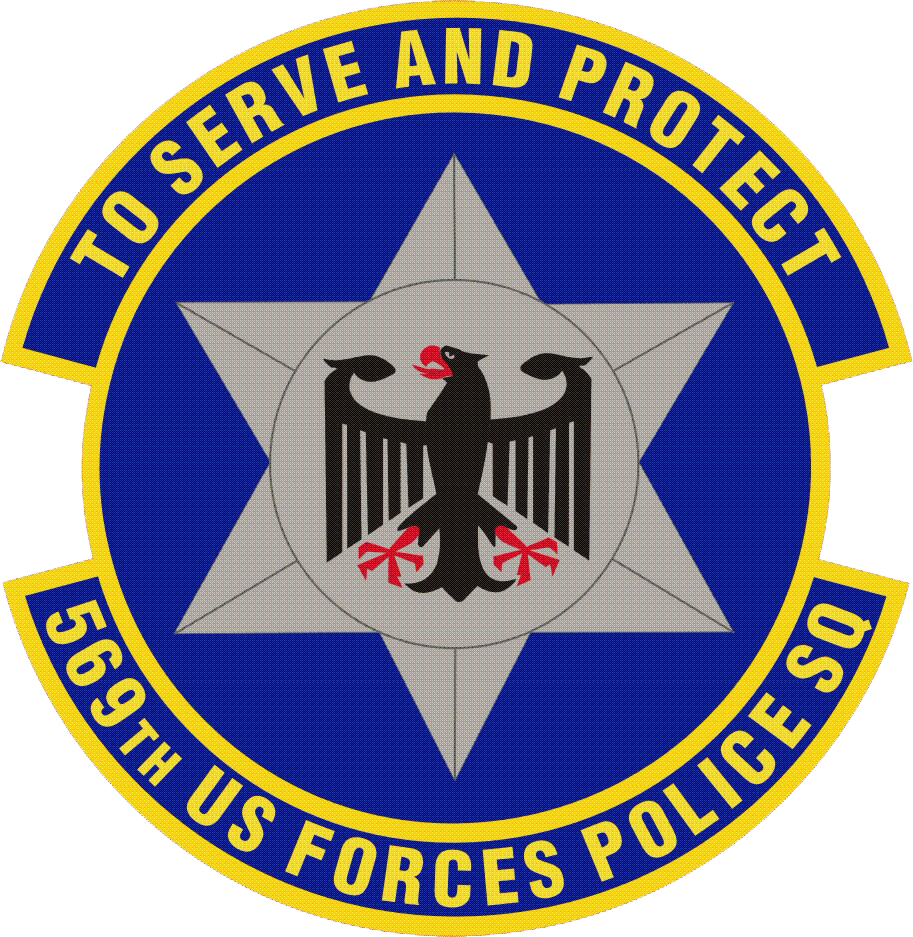
- 569th United States Forces Police Squadron emblem (Approved 14 September 2005)

The 569th United States Forces Police Squadron (569 USFPS), based in Vogelweh Military Complex, Germany, is an Air Force Security Forces squadron. The mission of the 569th USFPS is to protect and serve all U.S. forces and Air Force power projection platforms throughout the KMC. The Guardian Eagles, as they are referred to, work hand-in-hand with the U.S. Army 92d Military Police Company, civilian police, and the Rhineland-Palatinate State Police to accomplish their mission.

The 569th is the last "Security Police" squadron in the Air Force. All members are recognized by their Security Police ("SP") brassard. The 569 USFPS executes the Air Force's largest law enforcement mission, covering 1.1K square miles and providing police services to over 54,000 DoD personnel and their dependents, all while deploying and redeploying members to 15 different locations worldwide.

== Schools ==
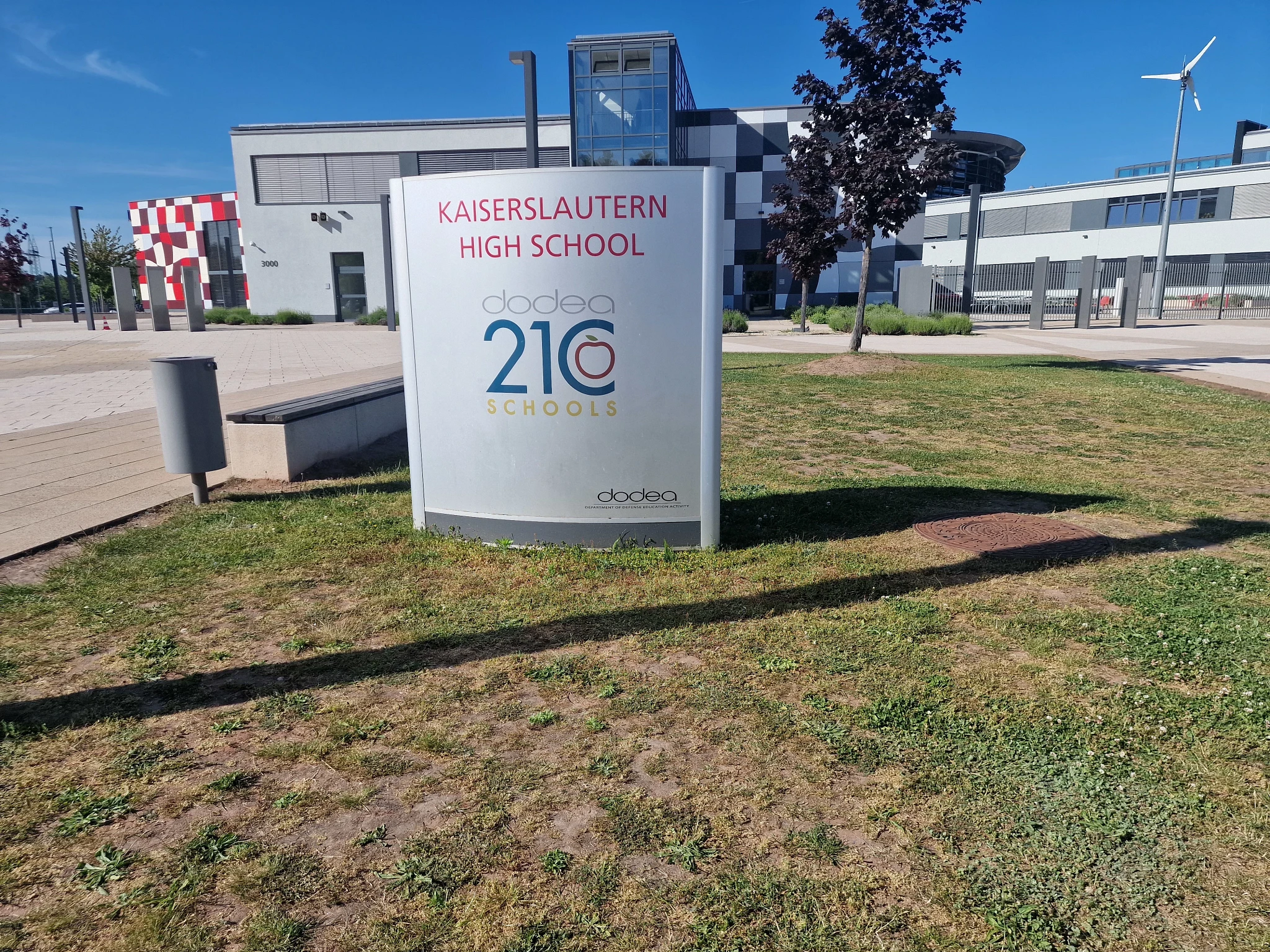
Kaiserslautern High School

Kaiserslautern Military Community includes Department of Defense Education Activity (DoDEA, formerly DoDDS) schools: Kaiserslautern Elementary, Middle, and High School, Vogelweh Elementary, Ramstein Elementary, Intermediate, Middle, and High School, Landstuhl Elementary Middle School, and Sembach Elementary School.

== Retail and residential ==
A combined Base Exchange (BX) and Post Exchange (PX) located on Ramstein Air Base makes it the largest AAFES shopping-facility in Europe - the Kaiserslautern Military Community Center (KMCC). This has become an attraction for service members and their families. Several libraries, American restaurants (including a Chili's and Romano's Macaroni Grill), and other facilities provide services exclusively for holders of DOD ID cards.

== See also ==
- Husterhoeh Kaserne
