= Ramstein High School =

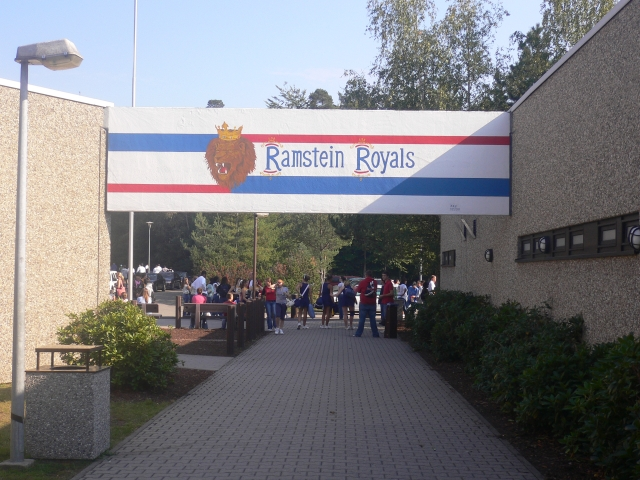
- Royals sign near front of school

Location
- Ramstein Airbase; Germany
- Coordinates: 49°26′47″N 7°34′29″E

Information
- Type: DoDEA Secondary
- School district: DoDEA East Europe district
- CEEB code: 576340
- Principal: Dr. Leah Zamor
- Faculty: Approx. 80
- Grades: 9–12
- Enrollment: Approx. 860 (in 2022-23)
- Campus size: Medium
- Colors: Blue and red
- Mascot: Royals (Lion)
- Website: www.dodea.edu/RamsteinHS/

Ramstein American High School (or RHS) is a Department of Defense Education Activity (DoDEA) high school in the Kaiserslautern district, Germany. RHS is a part of the Ramstein Community Schools in the Eastern Europe district that is run by the Department of Defense Education Activity (DoDEA). Their mascot is the Royal, a lion with a crown.

Ramstein American High School is located on Ramstein Air Base (RAB) which is just outside Kaiserslautern, Germany. The Kaiserslautern Military Community (KMC), which RAB is a part of, has an approximate population of 53,000 Americans, the largest concentration of United States Military outside of the United States.

In the 2022-23 school year, there are 863 students enrolled at the school.

== Accreditation ==
Ramstein HS is accredited by the North Central Association for Accreditation. Every five years the school is visited by North Central to assess the success of the school's individual school improvement plan. The professional and auxiliary staff members at school complete an in-depth report which addresses one affective and one cognitive area that the school has chosen to address in an outcomes based school improvement plan. This self-study is submitted to the North Central Association of Colleges and Schools for their review and evaluation.

Over the years Ramstein HS has been visited by the North Central Association and as a result has been recommended for outcomes-based accreditation. In addition to the accreditation visits, annual reports are submitted to the NCA, which serves as an update for the original self-study.

== Advanced Classes ==
=== English ===
- Honors World Literature (9th-10th)
- AP Language and Composition (11th-12th)
- AP English Literature (11th-12th)

=== History ===
- Honors World History (9th-10th)
- AP Human Geography (9th-12th)
- AP World History (10th-12th)
- AP U.S. History (11th-12th)
- AP European History (11th-12th)

=== Math ===
- AP Statistics (11th-12th)
- AP Precalculus (11th-12th)
- AP Calculus AB (11th-12th)
- AP Calculus BC (11th-12th)

=== Science ===
- AP Chemistry (10th-12th)
- AP Physics (11th-12th)
- AP Environmental Science (9th-11th)
- AP Biology (9th-11th)

=== Other ===
- AP Government (11th-12th)
- AP Psychology (11th-12th)
- AP Spanish (10th-12th)
- AP German (10th-12th)

In the past, Honors classes were considered "combined grades" classes where both the Honors History and Literature grades are averaged together and given as one grade, however in 2014 Honors History and Literature classes were separated and given individual grades.

The AP classes are also weighted grades on a students GPA.

== Music ==
Ramstein High School offers music classes for students to join. The three main performing bands are: Concert Winds, Varsity Band, and Jazz Band. As of the 2008 school year, the music program has expanded to include such classes as piano, guitar, big band, and string ensemble.

All students are offered the chance to tryout for the DoDEA Europe Music Festival (a.k.a. Honor Band) and DoDEA All Jazz Music Festival. Students in the Concert Winds and Jazz Bands tryout for their respective festivals.

Although lacking a marching band, the Ramstein Concert Winds is a "Pep" Band during the home games for the Ramstein Royals Football Team.

Ramstein also has a RockBand class, which was previously a club until the 2023-2024 school year.

The Ramstein bands have been acclaimed Europe-wide with almost 50% of the band making the Honors festivals.

Ramstein choral classes are Beginning, Advanced Choir and Show Choir (who participate in the Honors Choir Festivals).

== Athletics ==
=== Year Round ===
- Swimming

=== Fall Sports ===
- Football
- Volleyball
- Tennis
- Cross Country
- Cheerleading
- Golf

=== Winter Sports ===
- Basketball
- Wrestling
- Cheerleading
- Marksmanship

=== Spring Sports ===
- Soccer
- Track & Field
- Baseball
- Softball

=== Achievements ===
In 1987-1988 season, Ramstein Royals football team won the football Championship game against Nuremberg.

On November 2, 2013, the Ramstein Royals won the DoDEA-Europe volleyball championship.

In 2014, the Ramstein Royals cheer squad won the Division 1 Cheer Competition.

On February 22, 2022, the Ramstein Royals won the DoDEA-Europe Division 1 Basketball Championship.

== Feeding schools ==
The following schools feed into Ramstein High School either directly or indirectly:

- Landstuhl Elementary/Middle School (indirectly)
- Ramstein Elementary School (indirectly)
- Ramstein Intermediate School (indirectly)
- Ramstein Middle School (directly)
