= Golden State Exams =

Standardized tests for high schools in California, United States

The Golden State Exams (GSEs) were a family of exams that were administered to qualifying high achieving students in California during the mid 1980s through the early 2000s. The GSEs were designed based on California's curriculum framework. They were authorized in 1983 by Senate Bill 813. The first exams began being offered in 1987. Those who performed well on the exams earned one of the following awards: Recognition, Honors, or High Honors. Collectively, these awards were formally known as the Academic Excellence Awards. The exams were known for their rigorous nature. Each exam could only be taken once. The following is a timeline of when the various Golden State Exams began being offered:

- 1987 - Algebra GSE and Geometry GSE
- 1990 - Economics GSE and U.S. History GSE
- 1991 - Chemistry GSE and Biology GSE
- 1996 - Written Composition GSE
- 1997 - Government/Civics GSE
- 1999 - Second Year Spanish GSE and Physics GSE

There was one year (1995) when the only state testing administered in California was that to the high achieving individuals that qualified for the Golden State Exams. In 1998, high school comprehensive exams in "High School Reading/Literature" and "High School Math" became available to all students and school districts under the GSE banner. These two comprehensive exams were later integrated and absorbed into the California Standards Tests (CSTs).

In 2003, the GSE subject tests were discontinued due to budget cuts.

== Academic Excellence Awards ==
Students who received a Recognition, Honors, or High Honors Academic Excellence Award received a certificate award and a notation on their transcript specifying the level of achievement. Those who received Honors or High Honors were additionally given gold seals on their diploma specifying the level of achievement. Results for the 1993 Chemistry Golden State Exam provide an example of the scoring distribution. Of the total population of California high school students in 1993, including 1,424,094 public high school students, only 30,429 qualified for and took the 1993 Chemistry Golden State Exam. Of those 30,429 students, 1,167 (4%) earned High Honors, 1,950 (6%) earned Honors, and 6,922 (23%) earned Recognition.
