= Yokota High School =

DoDEA School at Yokota AB, Japan

- 横田ハイスクール

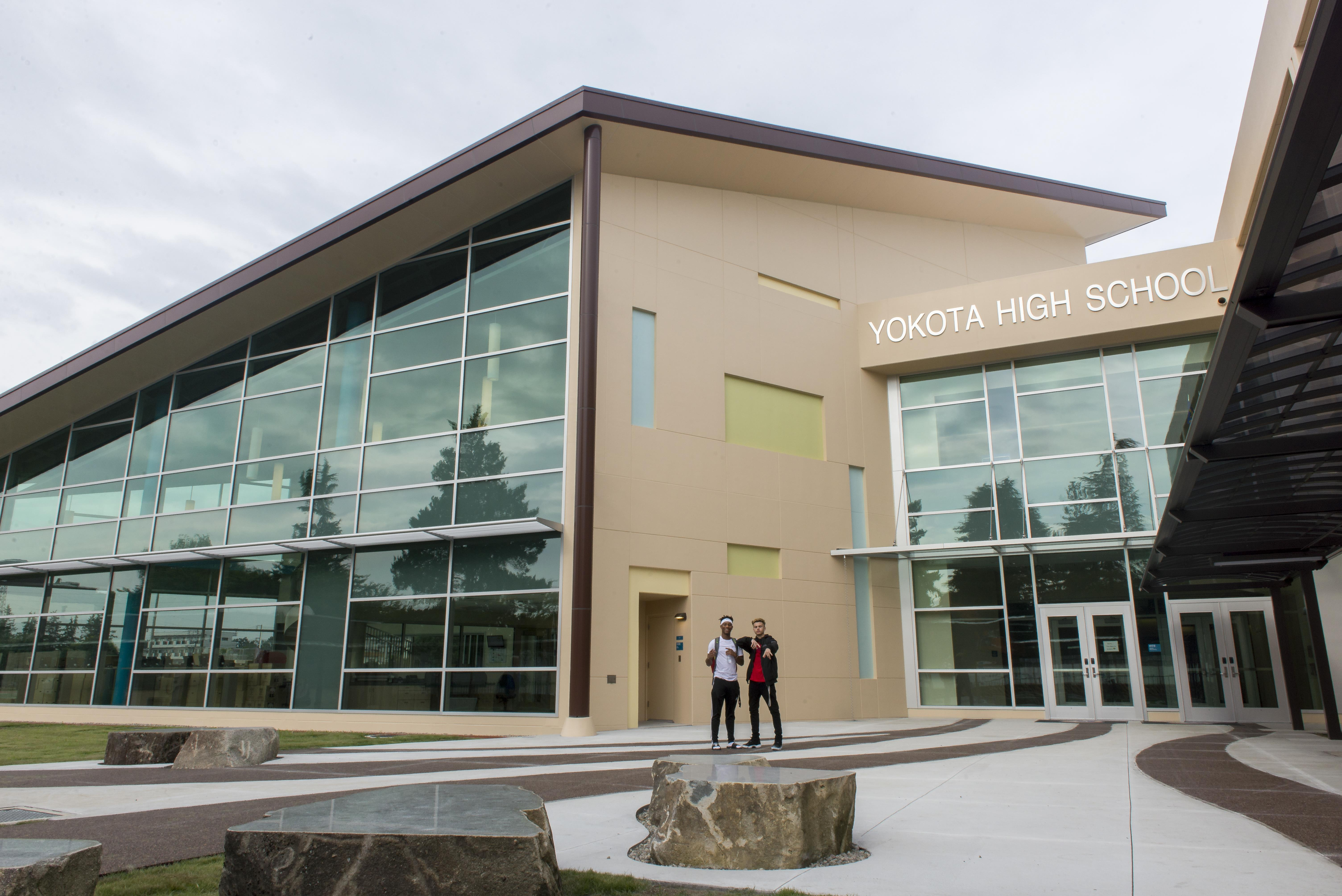

Location
- Yokota Air Base; Tokyo; Japan; 35°43′47″N 139°20′36″E

Information
- School type: Public
- School district: DoDEA Pacific
- CEEB code: 561620
- Principal: Rebecca Villagomez
- Grades: 9-12
- Enrollment: 285
- Student to teacher ratio: 18:1
- Colours: Blue and gold
- Mascot: Panthers
- Website: yokotahs.dodea.edu

Yokota High School (YHS) is a high school located on Yokota Air Base, Japan. It is part of the Department of Defense Education Activity.

It is in the Yokota Air Base South area, and in the municipality of Fussa.

== History ==
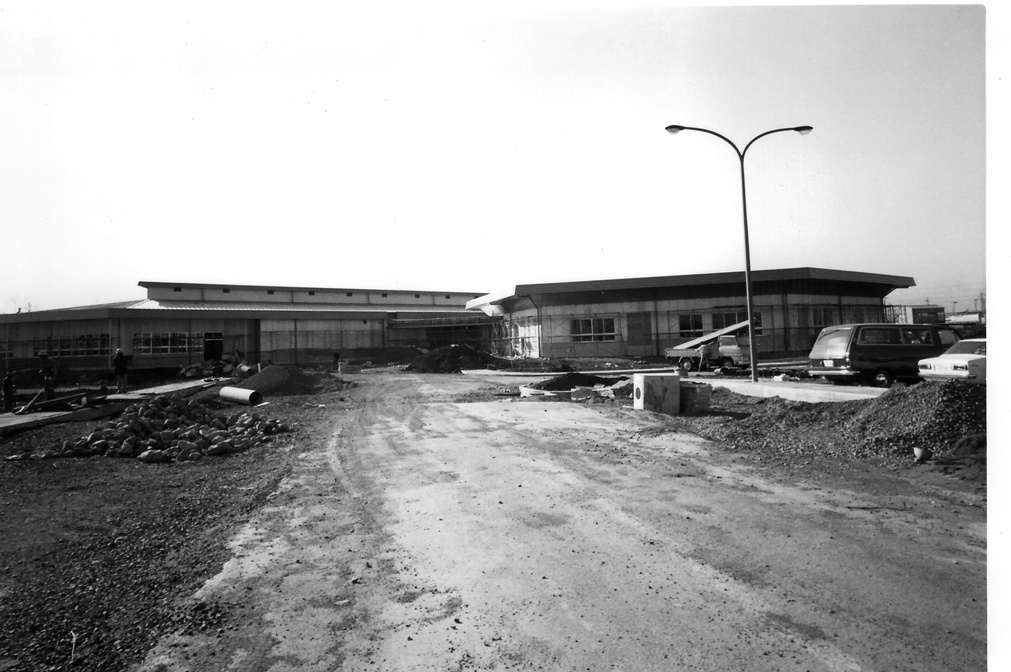
Yokota High School construction in April 1973

Yokota High School started construction in the 1970s after a deal was struck with the Government of Japan to modernize Yokota Air Base in exchange for Air Force property in Greater Tokyo. Yokota High School officially opened in 1973.

The school was designed as a "school with open doors" and students had a modular schedule containing 27 mods that they could choose from. The modular schedule continued under the next 2 principals.

=== Renovations ===
The school has gone through some renovations, including an artificial turf field, with both football and soccer lines and a surrounding track, which was built in 2012 at a cost of $1.2 million.

== New school ==
Starting in 2015 a new school was planned and the breaking ground ceremony took place on May 19, 2015; officially starting the construction period for the new school. The new school was built and completed in August 2017. Most of the old building has been torn down to make way for a soccer field and open land that will be given back to the Air Force. The new building is a 21st-century school and is the second 21st-century school in DoDEA. Each classroom has movable glass walls that are built to reflect the new method of learning which values collaboration.

== Extracurricular activities ==
Yokota High School offers a great amount of extracurricular activities for Academics or Sports for students to participate in. Most also have Far East Programs.

=== Academics ===
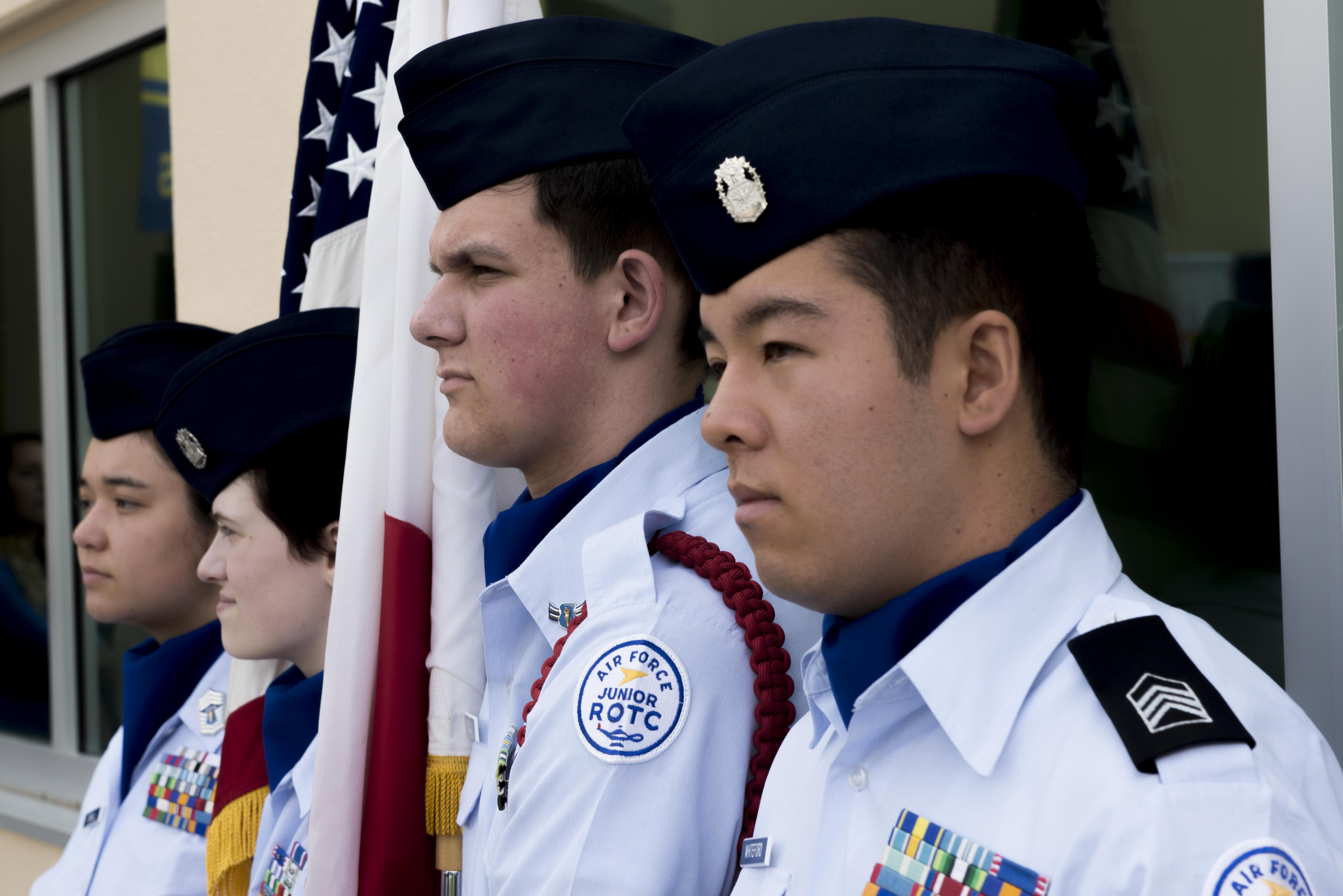
Yokota High School JROTC

- Air Force JROTC
- Analogue Game Club
- Art Club
- Band
- Chorus
- Debate
- Drama
- Model United Nations
- National Honor Society
- FE Creative Expression
- FE Film & Entertainment
- FE FTC Robotics
- FE Journalism
- FE LinguaFest
- FE Music
- FE STEM
- Garage Band
- Student Government Association
- Spanish Club
- Yearbook
- Poetry Club

=== Sports ===
==== Fall sports ====
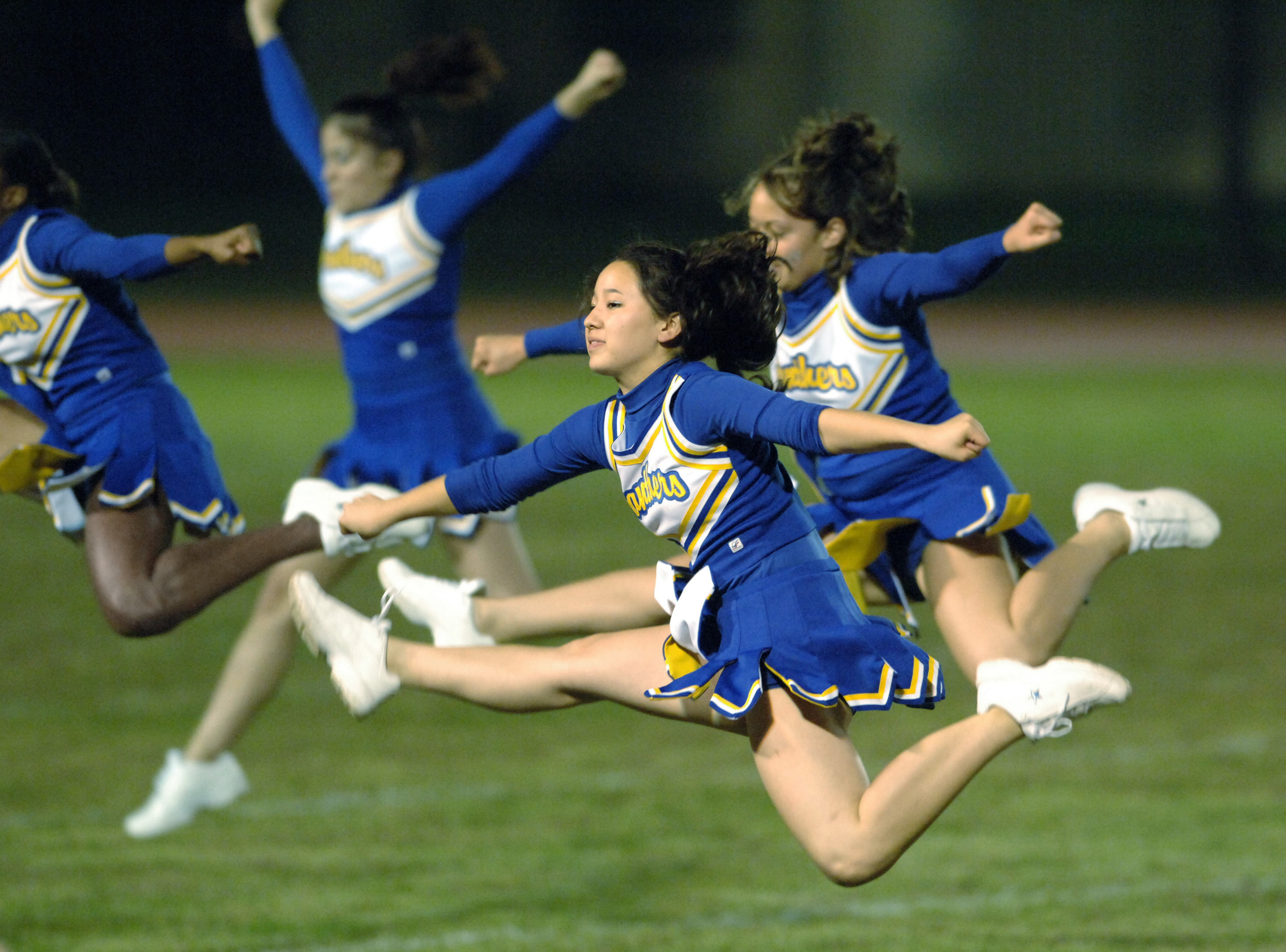
Yokota Cheerleaders

- Cheerleading
- Cross Country
- Football
- Tennis
- Volleyball

==== Winter sports ====
- Basketball (Boys/Girls)
- Cheerleading
- Wrestling

==== Spring sports ====
- Baseball
- Softball
- Boys soccer
- Girls soccer
- Track and field

== See also ==
- List of high schools in Tokyo
