= Seoul American High School =

1959–2019 school in Seoul, South Korea

- 서울미국인고등학교

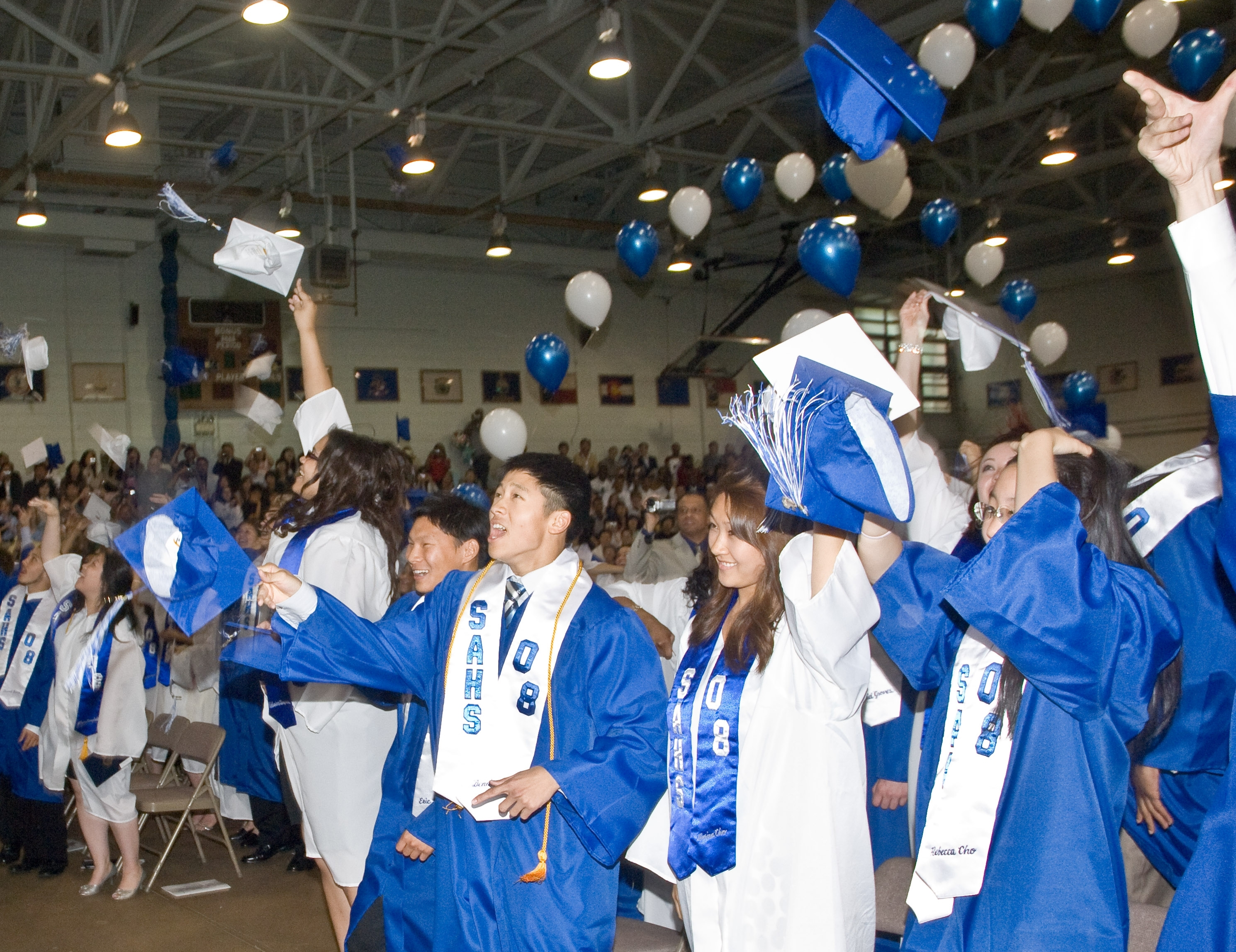
- Class of 2008 Graduation Ceremony

Location
- Unit 15549; APO, AP, Korea; 96205; South Korea (de facto); United States (de jure); 37°31′52″N 126°58′44″E

Information
- Founded: 1959
- Closed: 2019
- CEEB code: 562040
- Principal: Donald "Willy" Williams (last)
- Grades: 9–12
- Language: English
- Mascot: Falcon
- Communities served: Yongsan Garrison; K16 Air Base

Seoul American High School often abbreviated as SAHS was a secondary school in Yongsan Garrison, Seoul, South Korea, operated by the Department of Defense Education Activity (DODEA).

The school was part of the Pacific West District of the DODEA until 2019 when the school closed.

== History ==
Seoul American High School was established in 1959 to provide education for military and civilian families that were assigned to Yongsan Garrison. One hundred fifty students attended the school in the first school year (1959–1960). At its peak, the school had over 1000 students. One hundred forty-six students attended the school in its last school year (2018–2019).

== Closure ==
In 2019, Seoul American High School officially closed after 60 years. Due to the relocation of United States Forces Korea to Camp Humphreys, the school lost a significant amount of its student body which led to the closure.
