= SHAPE High School =

American high school in Mons, Belgium

Coordinates: 50°30′20″N 3°58′30″E

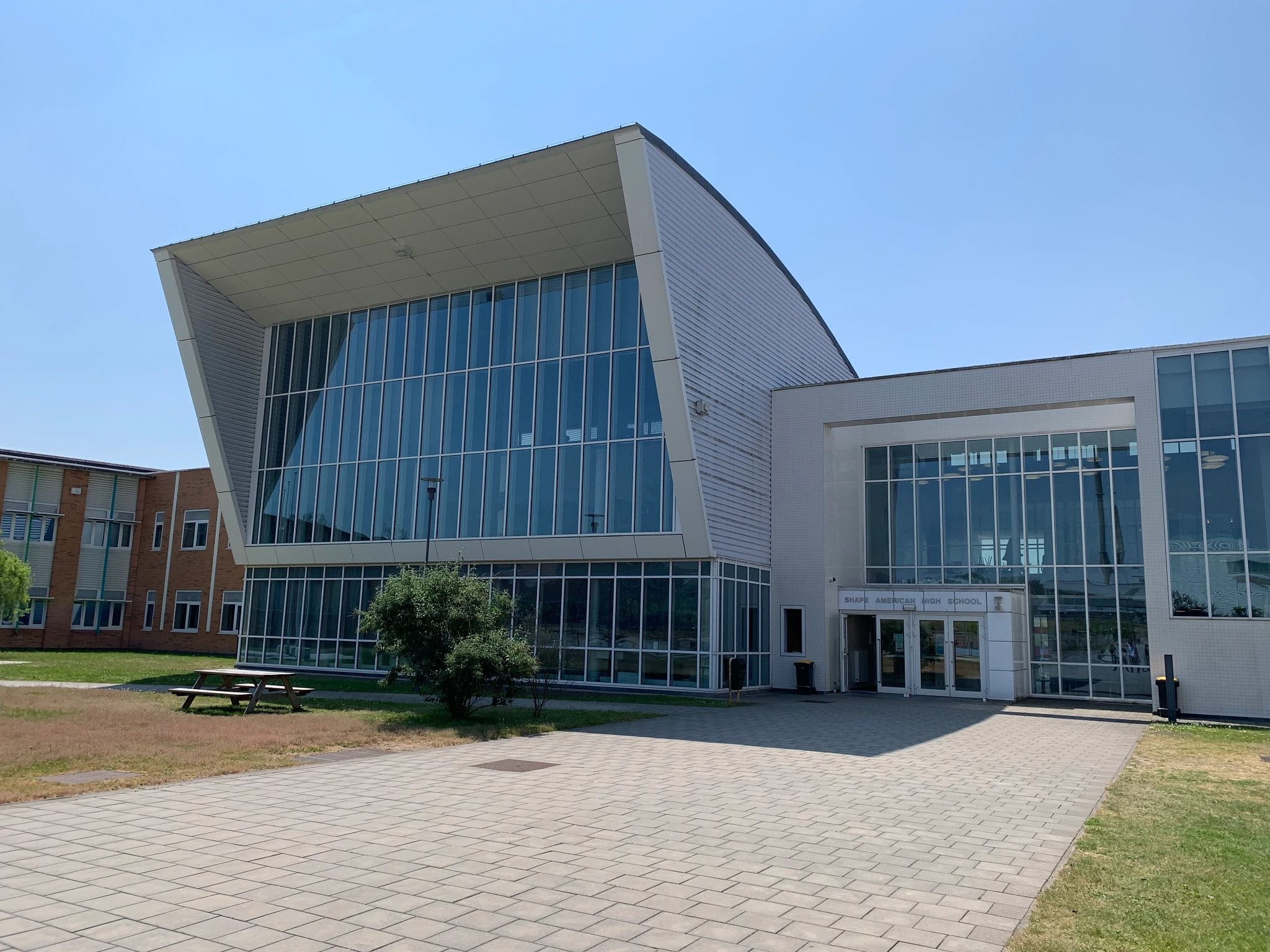
- SHAPE, Maisières; Belgium

Information
- Type: Public – DoDEA
- Established: 1967; 59 years ago
- CEEB code: 574020
- Principal: Shawn Rodman
- Enrollment: 330
- Colors: Green and light green
- Website: shapehs.dodea.edu

SHAPE American High School is a US Department of Defense Education Activity (DoDEA) high school for grades 9–12 located at Maisières, a town north of the city of Mons in Belgium. SHAPE American High School provides education for the dependents of military personnel and civilian employees at the Supreme Headquarters Allied Powers Europe (SHAPE), a NATO military installation. SHAPE High School adheres to a typical United States curricular and extracurricular program. The current SHAPE American High School was established in 1967 when SHAPE moved from Paris to Mons. The school separated into SHAPE Middle school and SHAPE High School in the 2014–2015 school year with the new completion of two new school buildings.

== Demographics ==
Most students of SHAPE American High School are dependents of the United States military and US civilian employees, but many are dependents of military members from the many other NATO nations represented at SHAPE. Typically SHAPE American High School has pupils of more than eighteen nationalities and sixteen languages. The students and faculty are exposed to many languages and cultures. American English is the primary language of instruction.

== Classes ==
SHAPE High School offers the following classes:

- Language Arts 7, 8, 9, 10, 11, 12
- Algebra I, Geometry, Algebra II, Pre Calculus,
- Physics Applications, Chemistry Applications, Biology, Chemistry, Physics
- World History 9, World History 10, US Government, P.E, Drama, Computer Applications, Applied Tech, Health
- Spanish I, II, III, IV French I, II, III, IV, V
- Model United Nations, Yearbook Production, Economics, Psychology, Street law, Sociology, JROTC, Art, Band and Chorus
- Honors Literature 9 and 10 (Can be substituted by Language Arts 9 and 10)
- Honors World History 9 (Can be substituted by World History 9)
- AP French Language and Culture, AP Spanish Language, AP Biology, AP Calculus, AP Chemistry, AP World History, AP Literature, and AP United States Government and Politics
- English as a Second Language (ESL) Intended for foreign students whose English language skills are not sufficient for Language Arts. Students who at the final exams are classified as fully proficient English speakers will attend Language Arts in the new year.

== Athletics ==
Shape American High School had the largest number of DII Football Titles between 1992 and 2012. The football team made playoffs for the 1st time in 2012 since 4 years passing. The boys 1993–94 cross-country team went undefeated and won the Division II European championship. The girls basketball team won the European Championship in 2012. The baseball team won their first Division II European Championship in 2012, led by All-European Award winners James Workman and Clay Coon. The boys basketball team of 2024-2025 won 3rd place in the European Basketball tournament (EUROS) and became the team that for the first time brought back a medal for Division 1 category. Opportunities are available to students in the three secondary sections, including:

- Autumn – Cross Country (running), American football, Volleyball, Tennis, Cheerleading, and Swimming (sponsored by S.I.S.)
- Winter – Basketball, Wrestling, Cheerleading, and Swimming (S.I.S.)
- Spring – Track and Field, Soccer, Baseball, and Softball

== Extracurricular activities ==
Some of the extracurricular activities offered at SHAPE High School are

- Mathcounts
- Math Olympiads
- Odyssey of the Mind
- Student Government
- Creative Connections
- Model United Nations
- Model United States Senate
- Student 2 Student (S2S)
- Homework Club

== Notable alumni and past students ==
- William B. Caldwell IV
- Ann E. Dunwoody (1971), first woman 4-star general in U.S. military and uniformed service
- Shona McIsaac, former British Member of Parliament (MP)
- James Roberts (2005)
- Alejandro Villanueva (2006), former Pittsburgh Steelers offensive tackle and former Army Ranger

== See also ==
- DODDS
- Supreme Headquarters Allied Powers Europe
- Department of Defense Education Activity
