= TerraNova (test) =

American series of standardized achievement tests

TerraNova is a series of standardized achievement tests used in the United States designed to assess K-12 student achievement in reading, language arts, mathematics, science, social studies, vocabulary, spelling, and other areas.

The test series is published by CTB/McGraw-Hill. On June 30, 2015 McGraw-Hill Education announced that Data Recognition Corporation (DRC) had agreed to acquire "key assets" of the CTB/McGraw-Hill assessment business.

TerraNova was created with an update in 1996 CTB to the California Achievement Tests and the California Tests of Basic Skills.

TerraNova are used by many Department of Defense Dependents Schools. The state of California used the test as part of the CAT/6 or California Achievement Tests, 6th edition as part of the statewide STAR testing program, though only in certain grades. The CAT series of tests have been available for quite some time and before many US states began developing their own standards-based tests as part of an overall testing movement in the United States, which began in the early 2000s. The CAT were also widely used outside of California to assess student achievement.

TerraNova are used widely throughout the United States.

== Tests ==
The tests are usually multiple choice and answered with bubble sheets. Many sections take fifteen minutes to a few hours, and the tests sometimes extend to over one day. Fifth grade and above include short answers. The results are nationally norm-referenced, meaning that students' scores reflect their achievement in comparison to all students who took the test nationally. Typically this is expressed as a raw score that is then converted into a percentile ranking. This is different from criterion-referenced tests, which measure student performance based on mastery of the material.

In 2015, CTB released TerraNova 3 Online. The online administered test includes a full battery of constructed-response and selected-response test items provides detailed diagnostic information on students' basic and applied skills.
