= Ernest J. King Middle High School =

E. J. King Middle High School

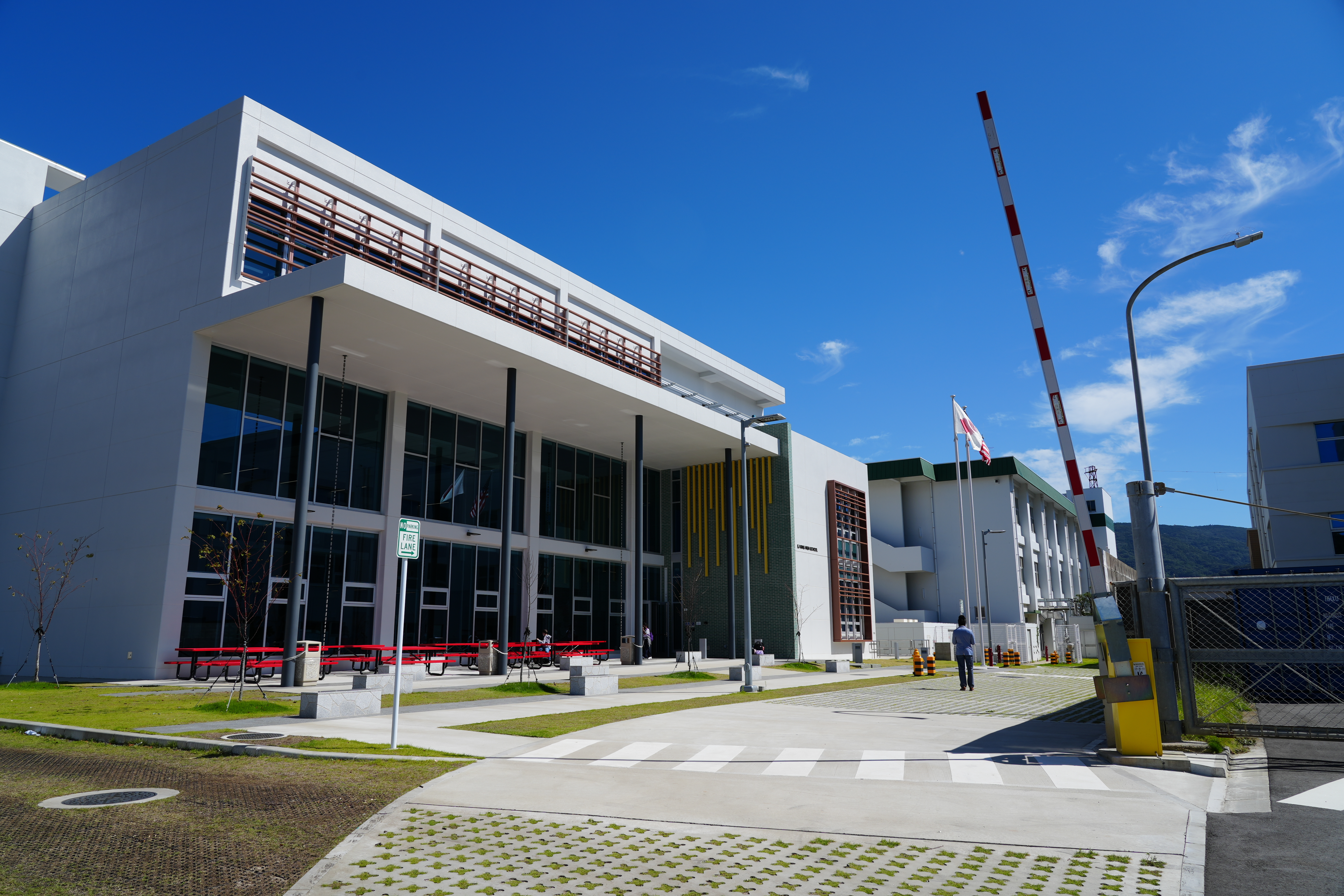
- EJ King MHS at its opening in 2022

Location
- Sasebo; Japan; 33.1704°N 129.7116°E

Information
- Type: DoDEA Pacific High School
- CEEB code: 680359
- Principal: Jennifer Gamble
- Grades: 6–12
- Enrollment: 384
- Colors: Red and black
- Mascot: Cobras
- Website: ejkingmhs.dodea.edu

Ernest J. King Middle High School is a United States Department of Defense school in United States Fleet Activities Sasebo, Sasebo, Japan. It was named after US Fleet Admiral Ernest J. King, who is notable for his actions in World War II.

== History ==
E.J. King was founded in 1948 by the name of Dragon School in a small wooden building at the heart of the Dragon Gulch residential military base of the southern Japanese city of Sasebo. Despite the strong naval presence in the port city, the U.S. Army handled most of the establishment and construction of the officially named Sasebo (American) Dependents School, APO 27. Running the school out of a Quonset hut, holding middle school (7th–8th grades) in the front half and high school (9th–12th grades) in the latter half, beginning with a total of 48 students (mostly Army dependents) from 1st to 12th grade. The original building had a sign christening the building "Dragon School" made by the Army Engineer Corps.

Linda Connelly was principal from circa 2000 until 2005, when she became Kadena Middle School's principal.

Recently, a new building opened in 2022. The cost was $54,500,000.
