= List of DoDDS high schools in Germany =

This is a sortable list of US Department of Defense Dependents Schools (DoDDS)/ Department of Defense Education Activity (DoDEA) that exist/existed in Germany, including dates open, mascot and school colors.

School	Opened	Closed	Mascot	Colors
Ansbach American High School	1973	Open	Cougars	Blue/Gold
Augsburg American High School	1955	1998	Apaches	Blue/Gray
Bad Aibling High School	1998	2004	Blitz	Blue/White
Bad Kreuznach High School	1960	2001	BearKats	Blue/Gold
Bamberg American High School	1980	2014	Barons	Blue/Gold
Berlin American High School	1946	1994	Cubs/Bears	Maroon/White
Bitburg American High School	1956	2017	Barons	Blue/White
Bonn American High School	1971	1997	Crusaders	Red/White
Bremen / Bremerhaven / Osterholz American High School	1946	1993	Black Hawks	Black/Gold
Frankfurt American High School	1946	1995	Eagles	Black/Gold
Fulda American High School	1983	1994	Falcons	Blue/White
Giessen American High School	1986	2007	Griffins	Red/Black
Hahn American High School	1975	1993	Hawks	Green/Yellow
Hanau American High School	1976	2008	Panthers	Black/Gold
Heidelberg American High School	1946	2013	Lions	Blue/Gold
Hohenfels Middle High School	1995	Open	Tigers	Blue/Black/White
Kaiserslautern American High School	1952	Open	Red Raiders	Red/White
Karlsruhe American High School	1958	1995	Knights	Black/White
Mannheim American High School	1956	2011	Bison	Purple/Gold
Munich American High School	1946	1992	Mustangs	Blue/White
Nürnberg American High School	1946	1995	Eagles	Green/White
Patch American High School	1979	2015	Panthers	Black/Gold
Ramstein American High School	1982	Open	Royals	Red/White/Blue
Spangdahlem High School (due to closure of Bitburg HS)	2017	Open	Sentinels	Orange/Black
Stuttgart/Ludwigsburg American High School	1952	1992	Stallions	Red/White
Stuttgart High School	2015	Open	Panthers	Black/Gold
Schweinfurt High School	2011	2014	Razor Backs	Red/Black/Silver
Ulm High School	1981	1991	Marauders	Red/White
Vilseck American High School	1976	Open	Falcons	Maroon/Gold
Wiesbaden American High School	1948	Open	Warrior	Blue/Gold
Wurzburg American High School	1954	2009	Wolves	Purple/Gold
Zweibrücken American High School	1971	1993	Trojans	Blue/White
