= Trinucleotide repeat containing 18 =

Protein-coding gene in the species Homo sapiens

TNRC18

Identifiers
- Aliases: TNRC18, CAGL79, TNRC18A, trinucleotide repeat containing 18
- External IDs: MGI: 3648294; GeneCards: TNRC18

Gene location (Human)
Chr.	Chromosome 7 (human)
Band	7p22.1	Start	5,306,790 bp
Band	7p22.1	End	5,425,414 bp

Gene location (Mouse)
Chr.	Chromosome 5 (mouse)
Band	5|5 G2	Start	142,724,661 bp
Band	5|5 G2	End	142,817,662 bp
RNA expression pattern
Bgee	Human / Mouse (ortholog); Top expressed in: sural nerve; cardiac muscle tissue of right atrium; skin of arm; ventricular zone; epithelium of colon; ganglionic eminence; nasal epithelium; popliteal artery; tibial arteries; myocardium of left ventricle / Top expressed in: Rostral migratory stream; ventricular zone; ascending aorta; granulocyte; aortic valve; genital tubercle; molar; gastrula; atrium; superior frontal gyrus; More reference expression data
BioGPS	n/a
Gene ontology
Molecular function	transcription cis-regulatory region binding; chromatin binding
Cellular component	chromatin; chromatin silencing complex; nuclear membrane; mitochondrion; nucleus; cytosol; nucleoplasm
Biological process	heterochromatin assembly
Sources:Amigo / QuickGO
Orthologs
Databases	NCBI: entry; OMA: entry
Species	Human	Mouse
Entrez	84629	231861
Ensembl	ENSG00000182095	ENSMUSG00000039477
UniProt	O15417	Q80WC3
RefSeq (mRNA)	NM_001013722; NM_001080495	NM_001122730; NM_178242
RefSeq (protein)	NP_001073964	NP_001116202; NP_839973
Location (UCSC)	Chr 7: 5.31 – 5.43 Mb	Chr 5: 142.72 – 142.82 Mb
PubMed search
- Wikidata
View/Edit Human	View/Edit Mouse

Trinucleotide repeat containing 18 is a protein that in humans is encoded by the TNRC18 gene.

== Function ==
The exact function of TNRC18 is not yet well understood by the scientific community. The protein sequence provided by the National Center for Biotechnology Information (NCBI) database includes a Bromo Adjacent Homology (BAH) Domain within TNRC18. BAH domains are often found in chromatin-associated proteins and assist in the silencing of genes.

== Gene ==
According to the UCSC Genome Browser, TNRC18 is located within Chromosome 7 in humans (chr7: 5,306,800-5,423,546). There are 29 introns and 30 exons listed. Directly preceding TNRC18 is SLC29A4 and immediately following is AC092171.4. SLC29A4 encodes the plasma membrane monoamine transporter in humans.

GeneCards lists five aliases for TNRC18, Long CAG Trinucleotide Repeat-Containing Gene 79 Protein, Trinucleotide Repeat-Containing Gene 18 Protein, CAGL79, KIAA1856, and TNRC18A. Additionally, TNRC18 has two paralogs, BAH Domain And Coiled-Coil Containing 1 (BAHCC1) and Bromo Adjacent Homology Domain Containing 1 (BAHD1).

== mRNA and Isoforms ==
The NCBI gene page for TNRC18 lists 9 different protein isoforms across 12 transcript variant mRNA sequences. TNRC18 isoform X7 is encoded by mRNA transcript variants X7-X10. Additionally, isoforms X8 and X9 are produced by variants X11 and X12 respectively.

TNRC18 Isoform variations
Isoform	mRNA	Protein	mRNA length (bp)	Protein length (aa)
TNRC18	NM_001080495	NP_001073964	10586	2968
TNRC18 isoform X1	XM_017012728	XP_016868217	10902	2979
TNRC18 isoform X2	XM_017012730	XP_016868219	10424	2978
TNRC18 isoform X3	XM_017012731	XP_016868220	10299	2936
TNRC18 isoform X4	XM_017012732	XP_016868221	10296	2935
TNRC18 isoform X5	XM_017012733	XP_016868222	10284	2931
TNRC18 isoform X6	XM_017012734	XP_016868223	11319	2929
TNRC18 isoform X7	XM_017012735	XP_016868224	10312	2905
TNRC18 isoform X7	XM_017012736	XP_016868225	10899	2905
TNRC18 isoform X7	XM_017012737	XP_016868226	10472	2905
TNRC18 isoform X7	XM_017012738	XP_016868227	10194	2905
TNRC18 isoform X8	XM_017012739	XP_016868228	6816	2189
TNRC18 isoform X9	XM_017012740	XP_016868229	6839	2094

== Protein ==
The protein sequence provided by NCBI lists human TNRC18 having a length of 2968 amino acids. The Compute pI/Mw tool program by ExPASy predicts the isoelectric point and molecular weight for the TNRC18 to be 8.88 and 315 kDa respectively. Additionally, the NCBI protein sequence for TNRC18 contains nine phosphorylation sites on TNRC18, eight phosphoserines and one phosphothreonine. There is a large serine repeat upstream of the BAH site located from amino acid positions 2604–2670. The BAH site is located on position 2816–2960.

The predicted secondary structure for TNRC18 consists of 32.61% alpha helix, 6.74% extended strand, and 60.55% random coil. This was found using the GOR4 program available at PRABI-Lyon-Gerland with the NCBI protein sequence for TNRC18.

== Expression ==
RNA sequencing of TNRC18 tissue samples found ubiquitous gene expression. Most prominent expression was observed within the colon, kidney, and prostate tissue samples. In fetal human tissue samples, notable expression was found in the stomach, lung, and brain. RNA sequencing data was acquired though the TNRC18 gene expression page found on NCBI.

The Human Protein Atlas shows highest RNA expression of TNRC18 in the brain, endocrine tissue, and muscle tissue. Additionally, the highest protein expression is observed in the brain, endocrine tissue, lung, gastrointestinal tract, and male and female specific tissues. Conversely, there is no protein expression in the eye or blood tissue, yet ubiquitous RNA expression for TNRC18.

TNRC18 expression in mouse brain can be found below. Noteworthy expression is observed in the olfactory bulb, isocortex, and cerebellar cortex shown in color. This image and brain atlas information is provided by the Allen Institute Brain Atlas.

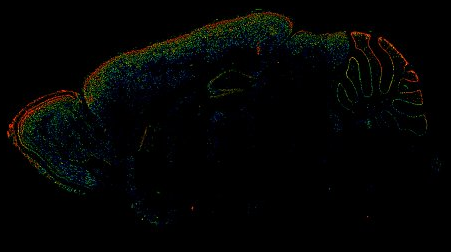
Expression of TNRC18 in Mus musculus brain. Expression is observed in the olfactory bulb, isocortex, and cerebellar cortex (see color). This image is provided by the Allen Institute Brain Atlas.

== Homology ==
NCBI Protein BLAST search for reference proteins lists the following orthologs for human TNRC18. The table is ordered first by increasing estimated date of divergence from humans in millions of years (MYA) and then by highest-to-lowest sequence identity with humans. Date of divergence information was acquired from TimeTree and sequence identify and similarity percentages were found by a pairwise sequence alignment using the European Bioinformatics Institute (EMBL-EBI) EMBOSS Needle program.

Orthologs for Homo sapiens TNRC18 gene
Species	Common name	NCBI Protein Accession	Date of Divergence (MYA)	Sequence Identity with Humans (%)	Sequence Similarity with Humans (%)	Length (aa)
Homo Sapiens	Human	NP_001073964	0	100	100	2968
Pongo abelii	Sumatran orangutan	XP_024097037	15.76	98.6	98.9	2964
Nomascus leucogenys	Northern white-cheeked gibbon	XP_030652734	19.8	98.4	98.8	2965
Ictidomys tridecemlineatus	Thirteen-lined ground squirrel	XP_021575654	90	85.3	88.2	2924
Rattus norvegicus	Brown Rat	NP_001100593	90	81.4	85.6	2900
Acinonyx jubatus	Cheetah	XP_026898111	96	87.5	89.9	2972
Orcinus orca	Killer whale	XP_012388176	96	87.3	89.8	2967
Lynx canadensis	Canada lynx	XP_030156810	96	87.3	89.8	2966
Enhydra lutris kenyoni	Sea otter	XP_022356606	96	86.8	89.6	2999
Odocoileus virginianus texanus	White-tailed deer	XP_020730376	96	86.2	89.1	2939
Ursus arctos horribilis	Grizzy Bear	XP_026371323	96	82.1	85	3111
Haliaeetus leucocephalus	Bald Eagle	XP_010568620	312	58.7	69.4	2928
Apteryx rowi	Okarito kiwi	XP_025939070	312	58.7	69.3	2932
Pogona vitticeps	Central bearded dragon	XP_020658091	312	54.7	65.7	2943
Python bivittatus	Burmese python	XP_015744874	312	53.6	65	2872
Perca flavescens	Yellow perch	XP_028454308	435	39.1	50.5	3044
Amphiprion ocellaris	Ocellaris clownfish	XP_023150301	435	39	50	3071
Branchiostoma belcheri	Lancelet	XP_019646059	684	25.6	36.5	2799
Saccoglossus kowalevskii	Acorn worm	XP_002738509	684	23.6	34.8	3174
Crassostrea virginica	Eastern oyster	XP_022319473	797	21	31.6	2200

== Predicted post-translational modifications and motifs ==
The following post-translational modifications and motifs are predicted for TNRC18 and found on the ExPASy Proteomics page. Exception to GPS-MSP methylation program which is found on The Cuckoo Workgroup site. This list is not conclusive of the total post-translational modifications or motifs associated with TNRC18 and is solely based on software predictions.

Of the predicted post-translational modifications, there are 92 O-Linked β-N-acetylglucosamine (O-ß-GlcNAc) sites with a high scoring threshold (>=0.5), 23 Sumoylation sites, two palmitoylation sites, one methylation site, and 52 glycation sites. Additionally, GPS 5.0 predicted 22,317 phosphorylation sites on TNRC18. The program was used to confirm the nine phosphorylation sites found on the NCBI protein page for TNRC18.

Predicted post-translational modifications and motifs for TNRC18
Program	Predicted post-translational modification	Amino Acid location on protein
YinOYang	O-ß-GlcNAc	80, 185, 199, 352, 416, 626, 627, 640, 788, 991, 995, 1033, 1038, 1533, 1753, 1956, 2023, 2368, 2404, 2510, 2557, 2559–2573, 2611, 2614–2667, 2721, 2892
GPS-SUMO (SUMOsp)	Sumoylation	238-242, 467, 620, 652, 858–862, 1159, 1258, 1461, 1544, 1629, 1638, 1704, 1743, 1885–1889, 1893, 1898, 1899, 2098, 2213–2217, 2259–2263, 2463, 2542, 2964-2968
CSS-Palm	Palmitoylation	284, 1196
GPS-MSP	Methylation	2332
GPS 5.0 Phosphorylation	Phosphorylation	263, 611, 1127, 1136, 1540, 1857, 1863, 2146, 2771
NetGlycate	Glycation	156, 197, 270, 272, 429, 492, 548, 609, 652. 692, 749, 755, 938, 988, 1058, 1059, 1131, 1370, 1461, 1470, 1503, 1554, 1558, 1577, 1615, 1618, 1791, 1797, 1893, 1895, 1898, 1899, 1933, 1967, 1978, 2028, 2091, 2301, 2315, 2328, 2388, 2438, 2475, 2519, 2702, 2709, 2720, 2750, 2801, 2816, 2857, 2869
Eukaryotic Linear Motif (ELM)	Coiled-Coil region	916-949, 1481-1516

== Clinical significance ==
Shen et al. observed circTNRC18 inhibiting miR-762 activity within pre-eclampsia (PE) placenta tissue samples. The inhibition of miR-762 by circTNRC18 resulted in elevated Grhl2 protein levels. PE placenta samples were observed to have lower miR-762 levels and higher Grhl2 levels which was attributed to overexpression of circTNRC18. Shen et al. conclude that circTNRC18 was upregulated in PE placentas when compared with normal pregnancy placentas.

Chu et al. found that from 19 CpG sites linked with glomerular filtration rate (eGFR), 5 were also linked with renal fibrosis and DNA methylation occurrences in the kidney cortex of chronic kidney disease (CKD) patients. Chu et. note that reduced eGFR is a defining feature of (CKD). These 5 CpG sites were found in proteins TNRC18, PTPN6/PHB2, ANKRD11, PQLC2, and PRPF8. Chu et al. conclude that epigenetic variation may be associated with CKD.
