= BAHS =

BAHS may refer to:

- Bad Axe High School, Bad Axe, Michigan, United States
- Boyd H. Anderson High School, Lauderdale Lakes, Florida, United States
- Bishop Anstey High School, Port of Spain, Trinidad and Tobago
- Broken Arrow Senior High School, Broken Arrow, Oklahoma, United States
- Brownsville Area High School, Brownsville, Pennsylvania, United States
- Bryan Adams High School, Dallas, Texas, United States
- Burnsville Alternative High School, Eagan, Minnesota, United States
- Beaver Area High School, Beaver, Pennsylvania, United States
- Berlin American High School, Berlin, Germany
- Bonn American High School, Bonn, Germany (precursor school of Bonn International School)
