= BAH =

BAH or Bah may refer to:

== People ==
- Bah Ndaw (born 1950), president of Mali from 2020 to 2021
- Bah (surname), including a list of people with that name

== Places ==
- Bah, a city in Agra district of Uttar Pradesh in India
  - Bah (Assembly constituency), in Uttar Pradesh, India
- The Bahamas, IOC country code BAH
- Bahrain, UNDP country code BAH
  - Bahrain International Airport, IATA airport code BAH

== Other uses ==
- Basic Allowance for Housing, a U.S. military privilege given to many military members
- Booz Allen Hamilton, an American management and information technology consulting firm, stock ticker BAH
- Bahamian Creole, ISO 639-3 language code bah
- BAH domain (bromo-adjacent homology), in molecular biology

== See also ==
- Bah humbug (disambiguation)
- BAHS (disambiguation)
- Bosnia and Herzegovina, a country in Southeastern Europe
- Bahrain, a country in the Persian Gulf
- Bah-Biau Punan language
