= Eagle Ridge Middle School =

Eagle Ridge Middle School may refer to:

- A school in Loudoun County Public Schools in Virginia
- A school in Burnsville–Eagan–Savage School District in Minnesota
