= Frankfurt American High School =

Frankfurt American High School (FAHS)
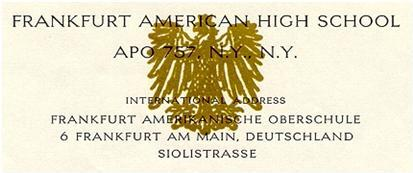
- Scan of Frankfurt American High School letterhead circa 1960

Location
- Siolistraße 41 at Miquelallee; Frankfurt am Main; Germany; 50°07′48″N 8°39′55″E

Information
- School type: Department of Defense Dependents Schools
- Motto: Eagles Über Alles
- Established: 1946
- Status: Closed
- Closed: 1995
- Grades: 10–12
- Colors: Black and gold
- Mascot: Eagle
- Newspaper: Eagles Echo
- Yearbook: Dackel ('47–'48), Erinnerung ('49–'60), Focus ('61–'95)

Frankfurt American High School (FAHS) was a Department of Defense Dependents Schools (DoDDS) system school located on what was once known as the Abrams Complex in Frankfurt, Germany. One of DoDDS original six high schools in Germany, the school served the children of American military, government and civilian personnel from 1946 until its closing in 1995. Originally known as the "Maroon Raiders", the "Eagle" was adopted as the school's mascot during the 1948–49 school year. The school's colors are black and gold. The motto is "Eagles Über Alles."

== History ==
The Frankfurt Community High School building, originally housing the Friedrich Ebert Reform School was constructed in 1929–30. Designed by Ernst May, Frankfurt city architect, the building was the first of its kind in Europe and drew visitors from all parts of Europe and America. The original school opened on 22 September 1930, enrolling children from 6 to 14 years of age.

In 1933, the Hitler regime renamed the school the Dietrich Eckart Schule. It was then used until 1939 as a German youth school. In 1939, the entire building was remodeled. The main portion was used as a German military hospital called Lazarett zum Heiligen Geist. The three wings were used as an officer's school by the German army. In 1944, the building was used for storing furniture of residents in and about Frankfurt who had been "bombed out" by the Allies. It was also used to house many homeless people. From May 1945 to September 1946, the building was used as billets for American troops, primarily Engineers and Signal battalions.

On 2 September 1946 the building at Am Bornheimer Hang 46 was vacated in order to be used as the Community High School. The new school opened with 185 students and had 24 graduates in the class of 1947. During the '46–'47 school year, 7th and 8th graders attended the school. Frankfurt, along with Berlin, Bremen (Bremerhaven), Heidelberg, Munich and Erlangen (Nürnberg), were the first American high schools to open in the European Theater between September and October 1946.

Originally called the Frankfurt Community High School, in 1951 it was known as Frankfurt High School. In 1961 the name again changed to Frankfurt American High School.

The 1952 Senior Prom at Kronberg Castle was featured in the 9 June 1952 issue of Life Magazine. The 1957 Senior Prom was held in the Casino, near the I.G. Farben building.

In the fall of 1954, the school moved to a newly constructed set of buildings on Siolistraße at Miquelallee, near the I.G. Farben building. The new school complex included new male and female dormitories.

Freshmen attended the school from 1946 until 1959 and again from 1988 until 1995.

== Dormitory life ==
A dormitory was located adjacent to the school to house students whose families lived too far away to commute daily.

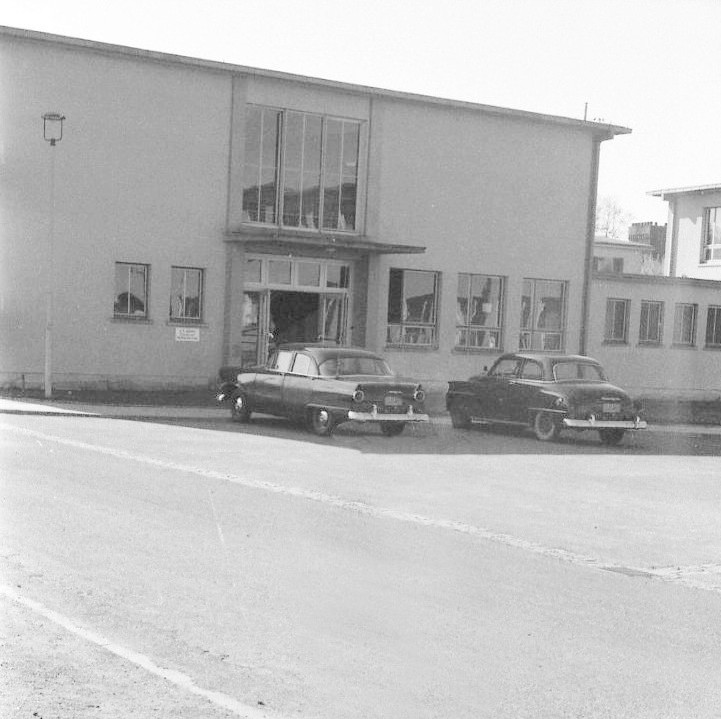
Entrance to the girl's dormitory as it appeared in the 1950s

Dormitory students (Dormies) included those residing only during the school week, five days, and those who lived so far away that they only went home on long holidays. The seven-day-students included those living as far away as Moscow and Kabul. Two students were assigned to each room. Generally, the underclassmen were housed on the bottom floor while upperclassmen occupied the upper floor. The girls' dorm was separated from the boys' dorm by a social lounge connecting the two. Occasionally, social events such as dance classes took place in this area.

In earlier days, dorm life was very structured and included a mandatory two hour study period each night. During the study periods, students were required to be seated at their desks, in the rooms, with the door open. The door was left open so that the adult monitors could see that each student was present and a minimum of distraction was adhered to. At the beginning of study hall, the building was locked down and everyone was in for the night (with a few exceptions). After study hall, there was a short period of time for night grooming, a short snack, and such, until lights out. In the 1970s restrictions were more relaxed. There was no study hour, but students had to be in the dorm by 8 pm, and "lights out" was at 10 pm.

== Military communities served ==
The following military communities were served by the school:

- Aschaffenburg
- Babenhausen
- Bad Hersfeld (McPheeters Kaserne)
- Bad Nauheim
- Bad Wildungen
- Butzbach
- Budingen
- Camp King
- Darmstadt
- Fritzlar
- Frankfurt
- Friedberg
- Fulda
- Gelnhausen
- Gießen
- Hanau
- Hoechst
- Kassel
- Rhein-Main
- Rothwesten
- Wetzlar
- Wiesbaden
- Wildflecken

And students from Bonn, where the U.S. Embassy was located.

== Closing ==
With the redeployment of US forces in response to the Gulf War and closing of bases in the Frankfurt region following the Cold War and German reunification, the school closed following the 1994–95 school year. The Abrams Complex was returned to the German Federal government and the school was transferred to the Philipp-Holzmann-Schule.

== Notable alumni ==
- John N. Abrams ('64) – Commander V Corps and TRADOC
- Mitch Bainwol ('77) – Past CEO of Recording Industry Association of America
- Gerald Brom ('83) – Gothic fantasy artist and illustrator
- Jonathan Cable ('66) – classical musician
- Marcus Calvin ('83) – Award Winning German Actor
- Peter Cooke ('67) – politician
- Herb Hall ('68) – Actor
- Jeanne Larsen ('67) – Author
- James M. Link ('60) – Commander U.S. Army Missile Command
- Julie A. (Smith) Moore ('79) – 2015 Oscar Winner and five-time nominee; Academy Award Winning Actress
- Joe R. Reeder ('66) – US Under Secretary of the Army
- Norman Schwarzkopf ('51) – Commander of the Coalition Forces in the Gulf War of 1991
- Russ Spiegel ('80) – Jazz Musician
- Humbert Roque "Rocky" Versace ('55) – Medal of Honor
- Stanley Whitaker ('72) – Musician
- Rowland Barnes, an American Superior Court Judge in Fulton County, Georgia.
