= Modulin =

Modulin may refer to:

- Modulen, The brand of dietary supplement by Nestlé designed for persons with Crohn's disease
- Phenol-soluble modulin, a family of protein toxins
- Toll-like receptor and TLR 2, proteins of which some were previously classified as "modulins"
- Nucleomodulin, proteins that enter the nucleus of eukaryotic cells
- A musical instrument that is a monophonic analogue homebuilt theremin/violin-esque synthesizer, invented by the band Wintergatan
