= Elba Serrano =

Professor of Neuroscience

Elba E. Serrano
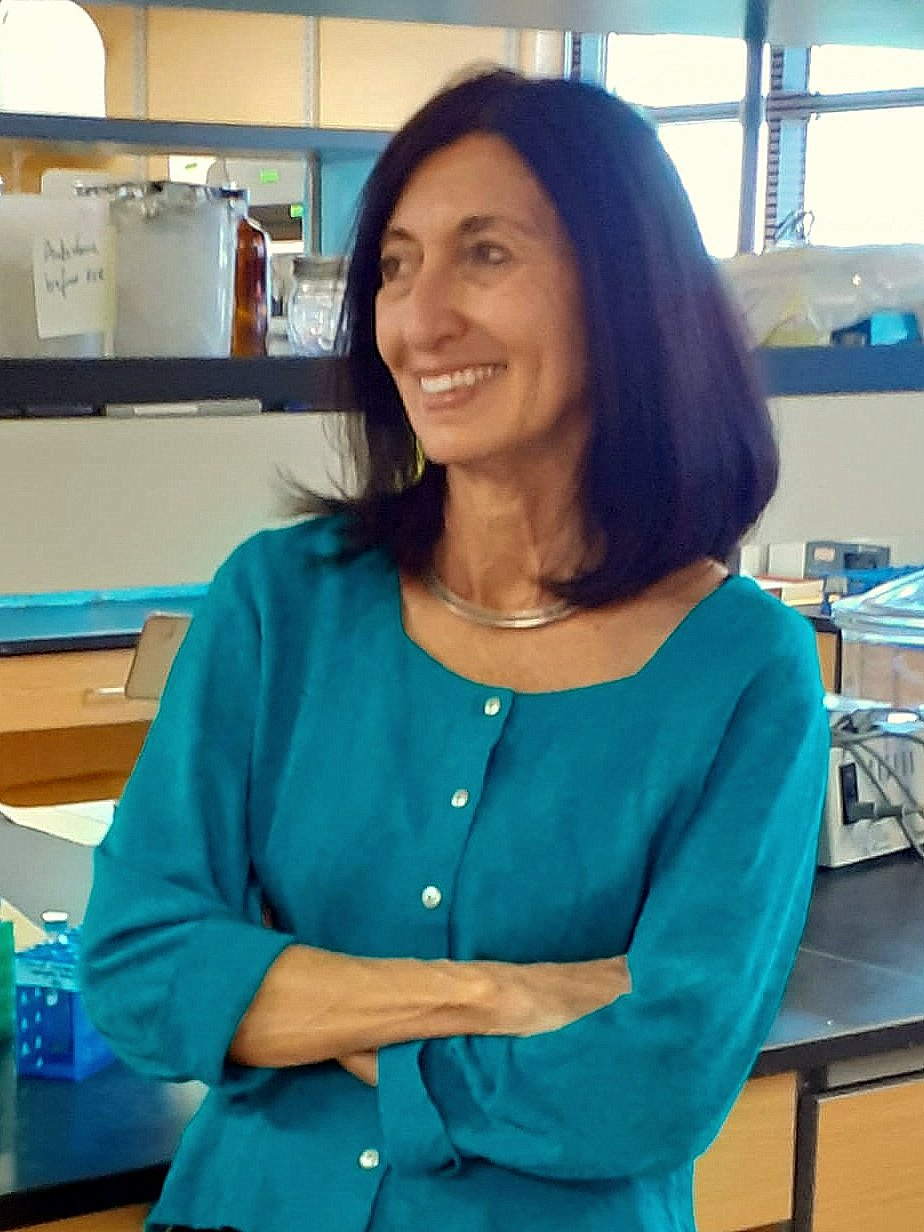
- Born: Old San Juan, Puerto Rico
- Education: Stanford University, (Ph.D) Biological Sciences (Neuroscience); University of Rochester, (BA) (Physics)
- Awards: Presidential Award for Excellence in Science, Mathematics, and Engineering Mentoring; Fellow of the American Association for the Advancement of Science; US Fulbright Scholar
- Scientific career
- Fields: neuroscience biophysics genetics cell biology STEM education
- Workplaces: New Mexico State University; University of California, Los Angeles; Stanford University

Elba E. Serrano is a neuroscientist and biophysicist who holds a position as a Regent's Professor of Biology at New Mexico State University.

She is known for her contributions to research on the nervous system of gastropods, inner ear development in Xenopus, neurobiology of glia, sensory signal transduction in guard cells, and for leadership of programs that recruit, train and retain underrepresented minorities in STEM. Her research considers the central role of ion channels in the reception and transduction of stimuli and integrates methods from genetics, physiology, and anatomy. In 2020 she was named as one of 100 inspiring Hispanic/Latinx scientists in America

== Early life and education ==
Serrano was born in Old San Juan. Her father was a sergeant in the United States Army and a military veteran, which meant that Serrano was raised in Central America, Asia and Europe. She attended almost ten different schools and eventually graduated from the Nurnberg American High School. She earned a bachelor's degree in physics at the University of Rochester, where she became interested in biophysics. Her undergraduate research was completed under the guidance of Edwin Carstensen, Professor of Electrical Engineering Whilst a physics student Serrano was one of two women out of eighty students.

She moved to Stanford University for her doctoral degree, where she earned a PhD in Biology specializing in neuroscience and biophysics under the supervision of Peter A. Getting in 1983. Her dissertation considered the movement of ions across the cell membrane of giant neurons. After earning her PhD she trained as a postdoctoral researcher with Bruce Ransom and Robert Schimke at Stanford University studying the effects of antiepileptic drugs and antineoplastic drugs on primary neural and glial cultures. She then joined the laboratory of Susumu Hagiwara at University of California, Los Angeles Medical School. Here she became interested in sensory cells in plants and in the inner ear, in particular, the mechanosensory hair cells.

== Career and research ==
Serrano joined New Mexico State University in 1992, where she established NMSU's first neuroscience research laboratory. Serrano was selected as a Regents Professor in 2009. Her research considers the ear, hearing and balance, as well as the role of neuroglia in brain function. She has studied the transduction of light by plant stomata and the formation of sensory organs, and the ways sensory cells acquire their phenotypes. She has developed approaches to image neurons and inner ear sensory cells with the scanning electron microscopy and transmission electron microscopy and in vivo, primarily using multi-photon microscopy., as well as using high throughput methods such as RNA-Seq and microarrays to study genes expressed in the inner ear and cell cultures of neuroglia.

== Awards and honors ==
Serrano is the recipient of numerous awards and honors. These include: election as a Fellow of the American Association for the Advancement of Science (2012); the Society for the Advancement of Chicanos/Hispanics and Native Americans in Science (SACNAS) Distinguished Mentor award (2015); the Presidential Award for Excellence in Science, Mathematics, and Engineering Mentoring (2018). Serrano also has been recognized as an American Association for the Advancement of Science International Lecturer on Women in Science (2002) and was awarded a Ford Foundation Fellowship. She is the recipient of a 2021 US Fulbright Scholar Award for research in Portugal at the University of Aveiro.

== Mentoring and advocacy ==
At New Mexico State University Serrano served as Principal Investigator of the institution's NIH Research Initiative for Scientific Enhancement (RISE) and as the co-originator of the NMSU NIH BP-ENDURE Building Research Achievement in Neuroscience (BRAiN) programs, which have supported hundreds of underrepresented minority students across the university to enter biomedical research careers. From 1992 to 2019 over one hundred and twenty students have earned degrees while completing mentored research in the Serrano laboratory, half of whom are women and over 60% are from underrepresented groups.

In 2018, the National Science Foundation announced that it would establish the National Resource Hub for STEM Education at Hispanic-serving institution(HSI Resource Hub) at New Mexico State University. under Serrano's leadership. The Hub's mission is to increase the capacity of Hispanic-serving institutions to provide research and education activities that recruit, train, and retain students for the STEM workforce.

== National service ==
Serrano has served on Francis Collins' Advisory Committee to the Director (ACD) of NIH National Institutes of Health (2014–2018). She has co-Chaired the ACD Working Group on Diversity with Hannah Valantine and is part of the NIH BRAIN Initiative Multi-Council Working Group. Serrano has worked on behalf of many scientific societies that promote research and student training including the Professional Development Committee for the Society for Neuroscience and the Steering Committee for the Annual Biomedical Research Conference for Minority Students.
