= Cary Sherman =

American lobbyist and executive

- Born: Cary H. Sherman; United States
- Education: Cornell University; Harvard Law School
- Occupations: Chairman and CEO of the Recording Industry Association of America
- Years active: 2011–2019

Cary Sherman is the former chairman and CEO of the Recording Industry Association of America, an organization representing the nation’s major music labels. The trade group’s member companies are responsible for creating, manufacturing, or distributing approximately 85 percent of all legalized sound recordings sold in the United States.

== Education ==
Sherman graduated from Cornell University in 1968, and Harvard Law School in 1971.

== RIAA ==
Sherman was hired as general counsel for RIAA in 1997. Throughout his tenure, Sherman has helped guide the industry’s efforts to facilitate new ways for fans to access music and to ensure that music creators are properly compensated as streaming media became the dominant format of the business. He was instrumental in the enactment of the Digital Performance Right in Sound Recordings Act in 1995, which along with his work on the Digital Millennium Copyright Act in 1998, established a new right for artists and labels to be compensated by digital music services. That right has since become the core legal foundation obligating streaming services to pay royalties for their subscription services – services that have become the primary catalyst for growth in the business. His work involved coordination and regulation of the industry's business, policy and legal objectives while his obligations remain primarily in technology, government affair issues, licensing and enforcement of rules and regulations. In 2010, Sherman helped the RIAA secure a $105 million settlement from LimeWire for copyright infringement. Sherman replaced Mitch Bainwol as CEO in August 2011.

Sherman is a strong advocate of SOPA and PIPA. Following the defeat of the bills in January 2012, Sherman penned an op-ed in The New York Times critical of the bills' detractors and their motives. The opinion piece was criticized.

== Personal life ==
An amateur musician and lyricist, he is a member of the Board of Levine Music in Washington, D.C., where he recently served as Chairman. Sherman also serves on the board of the Anti-Defamation League, and has served on numerous other boards, including the Copyright Society, Washington Area Lawyers for the Arts, The Computer Law Association, The Computer Lawyer, and BNA Records' Patent, Trademark and Copyright Journal.

== Family ==
Cary had 2 kids
