= Fulda American High School =

US Department of Defense school in Germany

Fulda American High School (FAHS) was a Department of Defense Dependents School (DoDDS) at Downs Barracks in Fulda, Germany. It provided education for the children of United States military, government and civilian personnel from 1983 until the military installation was closed in 1994.

Staff and faculty consisting of military spouses and independent contract civilians taught children in grades 7-12 (approximate ages 12-18) a curriculum which would most likely translate easily to and meet graduation requirements of most United States individual state high school programs.

The school's colors were blue and white and the mascot was the Fulda Falcon. The student sports and activities teams wore these colors or emblem and regularly traveled Europe to compete with fellow DoDDS students at other American installations.

Prior to the establishment of Fulda American High School, students were bussed to Frankfurt American High School and housed in dormitories during the week, returning to their parents quarters in and near Fulda for weekends and holidays. Following the Base Realignment and Closure in Germany after the Cold War and spurred by German reunification, the school closed permanently at the end of the 1993-94 school year. Downs Barracks was then returned to the German Federal government.

The football coach for the Falcons, Marcus George, has won more football games than any other coach in DoDDS history.

Former NBA player Shaquille O'Neal, whose stepfather was an Army NCO, attended FAHS in the mid-1980s.
