= Bonn American High School =

Coordinates: 50.705113°N 7.160336°E

- Bonn; Germany

Information
- School type: International School
- Language: English

Bonn American High School (BAHS) was an American international school located in Bonn, Germany.

Among the thirty-four American high schools opened in Germany by the United States Government (USG) during the Post-War period, Bonn American High School (BAHS) was unique in that it was the only school in the world built and owned by the U.S. Department of State. Developed out of an elementary school that originally opened in 1952, it was intended to support the families of personnel at the U.S. Embassy – which grew to become the largest U.S. Embassy in the world with over 900 Americans and 600 local staff – in Bonn, West Germany, then the linchpin of the West's engagement during the Cold War. When BAHS opened in 1971, it was only the thirteenth USG high school in Germany, and although not associated with a U.S. Department of Defense military installation, it was staffed and run as part of the Department of Defense Dependents Schools system in an arrangement between the Department of State and the Department of Defense. BAHS closed in 1997 following the transition of the Embassy to Berlin, and was part of the Post-War American Plittersdorf settlement, now a protected historical area.

== History ==
=== Beginnings ===
Bonn American High School traces its roots to Bonn American Elementary School (BAES), which was created after the end of World War II when Bonn became the capital of West Germany.

The American School on Rhine as it was initially called, had grades 1-8 and was located in an apartment building of the HICOG Plittersdorf housing project at the corner of Europastrasse and what was then Turmstrasse (later renamed Martin-Luther-King, Jr Strasse). US Assistant High Commissioner Chauncey G. Parker cut the ribbon opening the school on March 21, 1952.

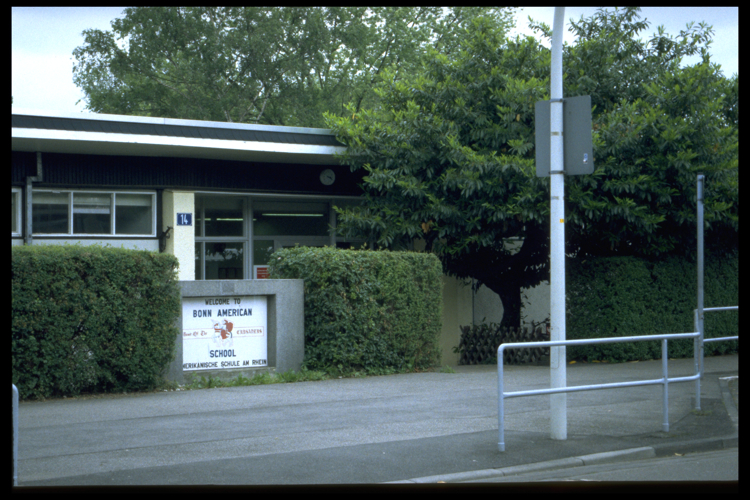
Bonn American High School's main entrance at 14 Martin Luther King, Jr Strasse. The school sign, replaced in the early 1980s, was designed by Dave Jessop, Class of 1982.

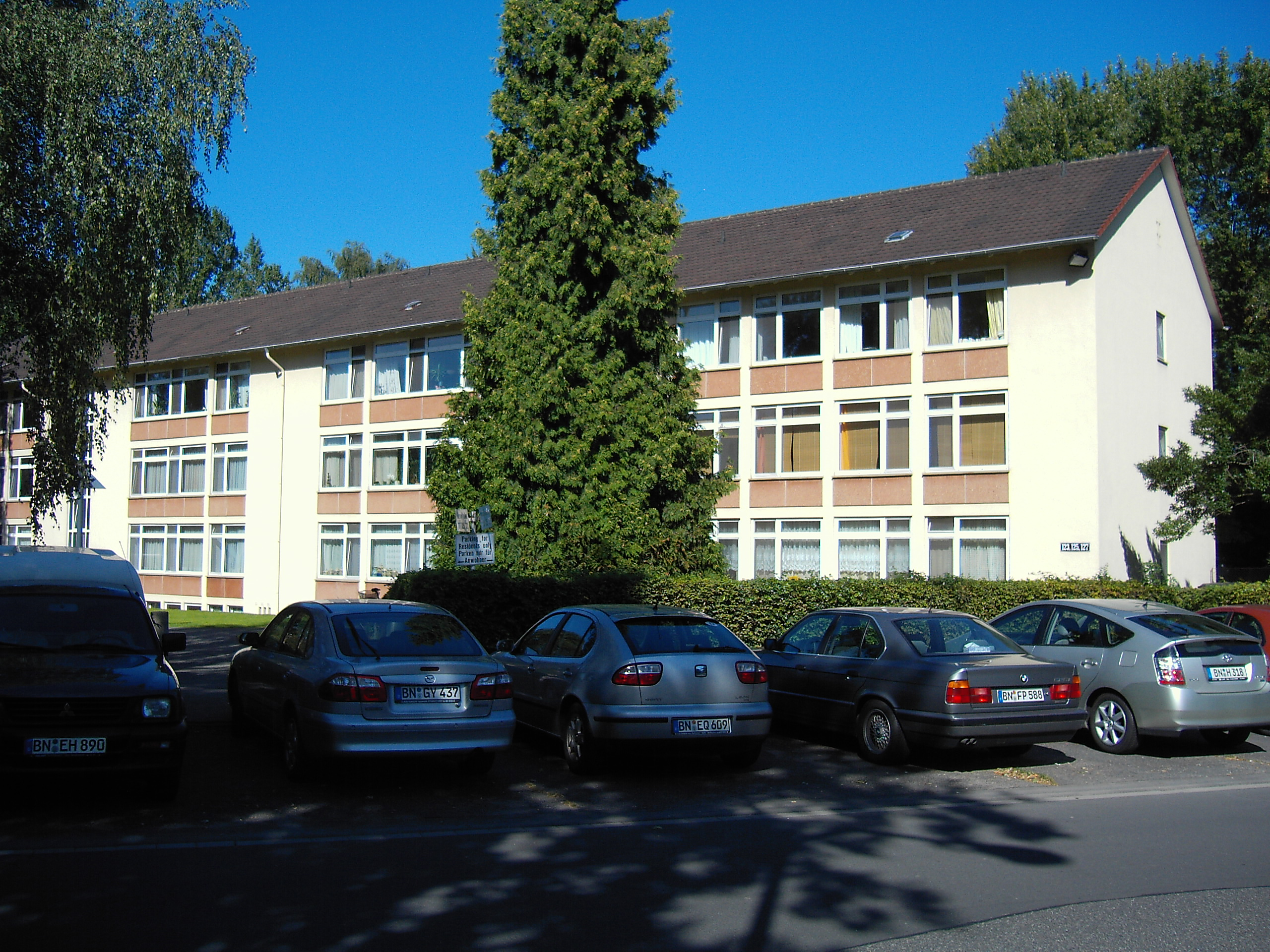
American Housing Community apartment building in Plittersdorf

The school was unique because it was the only school in the world owned and funded by the United States Department of State. Immediately following WWII's end, the four occupying powers – the United States, France, Great Britain, and the Soviet Union – administered Germany. The Allied High Commission formed by the United States, France, and Great Britain, also known as the High Commission for Occupied Germany (HICOG), was set up in the environs of Bonn, West Germany, in 1951. The U.S. Embassy in Mehlem, a suburb of Bonn-Bad Godesberg, was to become the largest U.S. Embassy in the world with over 900 U.S. Foreign Service Officers and staff from other U.S. Departments. It was convenient to St. Petersburg across the Rhine River where HICOG was physically located. With the arrival of HICOG also came the construction of housing for the Americans and a school for their children. Plittersdorf was the HICOG housing area for Americans; there were other HICOG housing areas for German Embassy staff in Muffendorf/Pennefeld and the Tannenbusch settlement.

Bonn was in the British Occupation Zone and not the American Occupation Zone, which was further south. Thus it fell to the U.S. Department of State to build and run the school. Later the Department of State maintained its ownership of the school but used the U.S. Department of Defense's program that ran a worldwide network of schools associated with U.S. military bases.

=== High school opening ===
Prior to the opening of BAHS in 1971, students of high school age attended the U.S. Department of Defense schools in Frankfurt, Wiesbaden and even Bitburg. They took a U.S. Embassy bus to these schools on Sunday evening and stayed in dormitories during the week, returning to Plittersdorf on Friday afternoon.

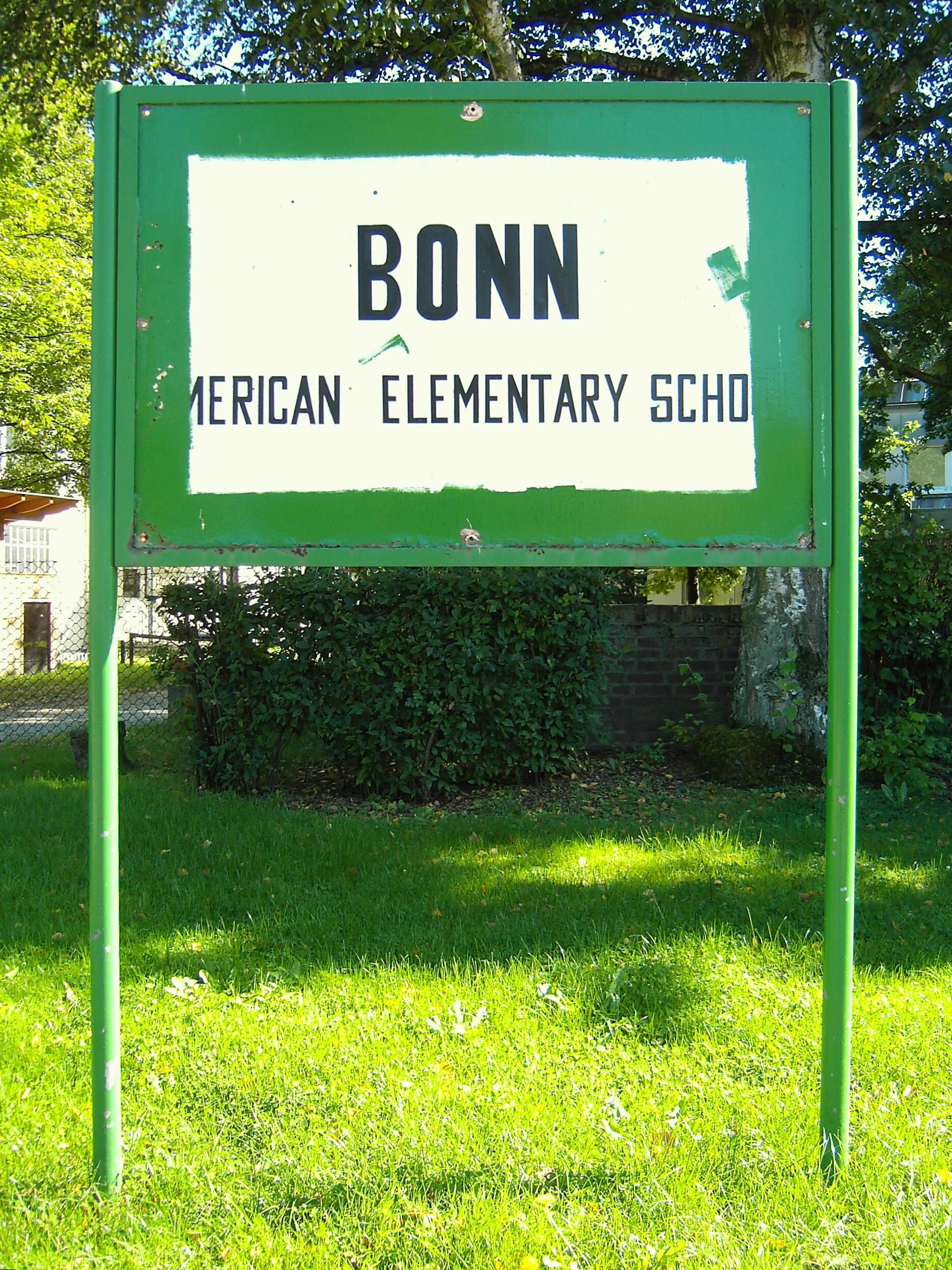
Bonn American Elementary School sign remains visible in Plittersdorf. BAES was housed in one of the Plittersdorf apartment buildings.

Unlike Berlin, Bonn had no particular international community, but in the Post-War period and throughout the Cold War, it was a key European capital. Thus BAHS not only served the U.S. Embassy in Bonn, but also drew students from Bonn's diplomatic community and international companies. For example, the 55 students of the Class of 1974 included eleven nationalities from five continents. Students from countries in conflict with each other sometimes attended and studied side by side at either BAHS or the BAES.

=== Closing ===
BAHS closed in 1997 following the transition of the capital of unified Germany to Berlin on 3 October 1990. Bonn International School opened in the same facilities as BAHS in autumn 1997, eventually demolishing and rebuilding the physical plant entirely.

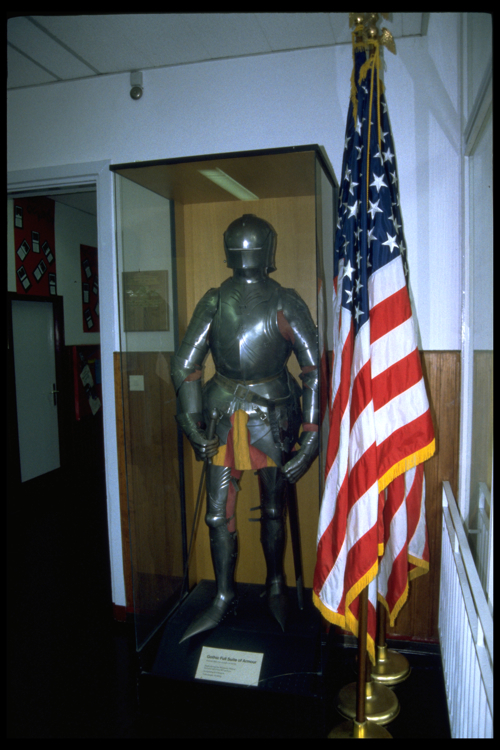
Bonn American High School Mascot "Clarence" just inside the main entry of BAHS, in 1997

== Mascot and school song ==
The Bonn American High School sports teams were known as the "Crusaders". Their mascot was Clarence, a suit of armor now in the archives of the American Overseas Schools Historical Society in Wichita, Kansas. The school colors were red and white, although initially letter jackets were black with white sleeves. The school song was sung to the tune of the University of Notre Dame's fight song.

== Sports ==
BAHS was in the Benenor Conference, which was made up of DoDDs and NATO schools in Belgium, The Netherlands, and Northern Germany. Frequent opponents included Brussels American School, International School of Brussels (ISB), and SHAPE (all in Brussels); AFCENT (Netherlands), and Hahn (Germany). Away games in Bremerhaven and Brussels usually included an overnight given that they were five or more hours away by bus.

In the 1970s and 1980s the school dominated the conference in boys' basketball (Bob Agnew, coach), soccer (John Gengler, coach), and wrestling (John Tate and Jim Manuel, coaches); and in girls' volleyball (Betty Keitel, coach) and girls' basketball. The school also fielded boys' and girls' teams in cross-country, track and field, and tennis.

Football was never a BAHS strength. After 0-7-0 (lost Homecoming 82-6) & 0-6-1 seasons, BAHS won its first game in 1973 finishing with a record of 3–3–1. The only winning teams were 1978 (5–2–0), 1979 (6–2–0), 1988? (4–3–0) and 1993? (5–2–0), while losing its only championship game 7–6 in 1979 (@Osterholz). In 25 Football seasons BAHS had a 1–24 record for season opening games, beating only Hahn 22–20 in 1978. BAHSs' most successful period was a 9-1-0 stretch between 1978 & 1979. BAHS finished with a 28-102-10 all-time record and two All-Europe selections: Steve de Santo LB 1978, and Matthew Westerhorstmann 1979 LB & OL.

The boys' basketball team was a perennial powerhouse, winning the European Championship in its first season in 1971/72 with a 16–1 record. The 1972/73 team went 15-2 followed by an undefeated 17-0 championship team in 1973/74 with All-Europe selections, Gerry Blattner and David Bolen. Successful years followed (12–5 in 1974/75) culminating in the 1977/78 championship and 14–5 record. The undefeated team of 1979/80 (16-0) began a string of six championships running through the 1984/85 season. BAHS never had a losing record in boys' basketball throughout the 1970s and 1980s.

The boys soccer program was hugely successful throughout BAHS's existence. In the 70's and 80's several conference championships were won including 1972, 1973, 1976, and 1978–1981. The 1978 team was 6-0-0 with a goal differential of 34-5 placing 6 players on the All-conference team. BAHS had a 20+ game winning streak including 3 straight undefeated seasons from 1978 to 1980.

Baseball was passionately played during the summer months in Bonn. Shapiro Field, home of the Little League program until 1972, was considered one of the best baseball fields in Europe. Unfortunately Shapiro Field was torn down in 1973 allowing the American Club to expand and build additional tennis courts. The 1972 little league team won its final games at Shapiro Field against Camp New Amsterdam 9-1 & 9–2. One week later at the regional tournament in Bitburg Bonn lost to the eventual European Champion Bitburg 2–0, beat Bremerhaven 15–4, finally losing to Ramstein 2–0. In 1973 at the regional tournament in Wiesbaden Bonn lost 11–1 against Ramstein, beat Karlsruhe 5-2 while eliminated 3–2 by Wiesbaden in game 3. Steve de Santo was tournament Homerun King hitting 2 Homeruns in three games while Joe Pino Sr. was head coach.

After going 0–16 in 1979, Bonn won the European Championship in 1984 in the Senior Baseball Division (16–18 yrs) representing Europe at the World Championships in the USA.

== Notable alumni ==
- Samuel Assefa – ambassador; class of 1974
- Lael Brainard – economist; Board of Governors, U.S. Federal Reserve; class of 1980
- Patricia Orr Duff – activist and philanthropist; class of 1971
- Hans Klemm – ambassador; class of 1975
- Dominic Gerald Lowery – professional football player, class of 1974
- Charles Petrie OBE – diplomat and banker; class of 1977
- Ron Prosor – ambassador; class of 1976
- Ray Shindledecker – bassist and lead singer for Breakingform; class 1979–81
- Kantathi Suphamongkhon – Foreign Minister of Thailand; class of 1970
- Simon Ungers – architect; class of 1975
- Natalia Paruz - musical saw player; class of 1977-8

== See also ==
- List of DoDDS high schools in Germany
