= Russ Spiegel =

American jazz musician

- Born: March 30, 1962 (age 64); Los Angeles, California
- Genres: Jazz
- Occupations: Musician, actor
- Instrument: Guitar

Russ Spiegel (born March 30, 1962) is a New York City-based jazz guitarist, composer, arranger, film scorer, and actor who has made successful forays into screenwriting and film production. Known for such well-received albums as Twilight (for the German/Dutch jazz label Double Moon, 2001), Chimera (for the major indie jazz label Steeplechase, 2007), and Transplants (Ruzztone, 2009), he has performed with Tony Bennett, Petula Clark, and Gene "Mighty Flea" Conners. In addition to his contributions to jazz, he has made his mark on pop culture, serving as music coach and guitar instructor to the young actors on Nickelodeon's popular series The Naked Brothers Band.

== Early life and education ==
Spiegel, a member of a musically inclined family, was born in Los Angeles, California, and raised in Santa Monica. Spiegel's older sister plays the bluegrass fiddle, and his brother is a pianist and composer. Their father is an avid amateur jazz trumpet player.

A fan of pop radio as a youngster, Spiegel discovered rock music as he entered his teens. He soon became determined to own an electric guitar and took lessons at a local music store in Fountain Valley, later earning enough pocket money to purchase a Fender Stratocaster. He began jamming with other area musicians, eventually forming a rock cover band that played house parties around Orange County.

While Spiegel was in his late teens, his father found a job at Rhein-Main Air Base, near Frankfurt, Germany. Upon graduating from Frankfurt American High School, Spiegel entered the University of Maryland, which maintained a campus in Munich. While there, he formed a progressive-rock band, joined a local R&B and soul unit, and began learning jazz standards. In 1982 Spiegel returned to the U.S. to complete his bachelor's degree at the University of Michigan, in Ann Arbor, earning a degree in philosophy.

In 1986 Spiegel applied for and won a scholarship to the renowned Berklee College of Music, in Boston. Upon completion of his studies, he relocated to Germany in 1988.

== Music career ==
Once in Germany Spiegel gradually made contacts in the music world and began playing on military bases and at local jazz clubs and festivals. During a stint in Paris he formed a quartet called Guitar Hell, which toured widely in France and Germany. He soon found himself in demand as a guitarist and electric bassist with various European big bands, jazz ensembles, and blues groups. Joining the band of the popular American trombonist/vocalist Gene "Mighty Flea" Conners, Spiegel performed concerts throughout Germany, Switzerland, Austria, Belgium, and the Netherlands.

Around the same time, Spiegel joined the band of German jazz organist Barbara Dennerlein. With Dennerlein he played numerous tours and jazz festivals throughout Europe and performed with her band on several television and radio shows. Thanks to his greatly enhanced profile, in 1999 he was awarded the coveted Jazz Scholarship by the city of Frankfurt for his contributions to the city's artistic scene.

In 2001 Spiegel returned to the U.S., settling in New York City. There he studied under teachers Adam Rogers, Paul Bollenback, Ben Monder and John Patitucci, receiving his master's degree in jazz performance from the City College of New York.

In 2008 his Jazz/North Indian classical fusion ensemble, Sundar Shor, undertook a tour of India under the auspices of the American Center, and it has toured widely in Europe as well.

== Screen career ==
Spiegel was the music coach and guitar teacher for Nat & Alex Wolff, the two young siblings who starred in Nickelodeon's hit TV show The Naked Brothers Band and now tour as the Wolff Brothers. In 2005 the band of fledgling rockers had been the subject of a Nickelodeon channel "mockumentary" titled The Naked Brothers Band: The Movie, which was later used as the pilot for the series. The show ran from 2007 to 2009, during which time Spiegel also occasionally appeared on-screen or filled in as an instrument wrangler. He was next cast as a musician in the film comedy What Happens in Vegas (2008), played a similar part in When in Rome (2010), and won a recurring, uncredited role in the TV series 30 Rock.

Spiegel has also composed music for the shorts Waterfront Access (2009), Psychobabble (2010), and I Am Julia (2011), as well as for the documentary Building Bridges (2011), about a group of high school students from New York who travel to India. In 2010 he produced, scored, and wrote the screenplay for Das Boots, a short film about two Brooklyn hipsters who must deal with an unwelcome houseguest. In 2011 he also appeared in "Mercy" the 1st episode of the 2nd season of the CBS show Blue Bloods as a member of Tony Bennett's band.

== Discography ==
=== As leader ===
- Monky (Mongothrob, 1998)
- Twilight (Doublemoon, 2001)
- Chimera (SteepleChase, 2007)
- Transplants (Ruzztone, 2009)
- Wait a Minute (Ruzztone, 2019)
- Caribbean Blue (Ruzztone, 2023)
- Nitty Gritty (Ruzztone, 2025)
- Timepieces (Ruzztone, 2026)

=== As guest ===
- Barbara Leah Meyer, Winter Child (Laika, 2002)
- Alberto Menendez, Waiting for Naima (In + Out, 2002)
- Bill Warfield Big Band, A Faceless Place (Laurel Hill, 2005)
- Martelle, Little Big Waters (Monogenuss, 2007)
- LouPoe, Blues Box (Happy Records, 2014)
- Mihal Soltan, MeloGranie (ArtHorse, 2017)
- Two Sheds Jackson, Some Kinda Life (HOFA, 2018)
- Javier Nero, Freedom (Outside in Music, 2020)
- Scott Reeves Quintet, The Alchemist (Origin Records, 2021)

=== As arranger ===
- CCCN Orchestra and Hendrik Meurkens, Big Band Brasil (Drumit, 2024)
