= Rowland Barnes =

American judge

Rowland W. Barnes
- Born: April 25, 1940; Cheyenne, Wyoming
- Died: March 11, 2005 (aged 64); Fulton County Courthouse, Atlanta, Georgia
- Cause of death: Murder
- Education: Frankfurt High School; Lebanon Valley College; George Washington University; Emory University School of Law
- Occupation: Superior Court Judge

Rowland Wayne Barnes (April 25, 1940 – March 11, 2005) was an American Superior Court Judge in Fulton County, Georgia. He oversaw the 2003 trial of the professional ice hockey player Dany Heatley, who was charged with vehicular homicide after the death of teammate Dan Snyder in a car accident. In an unrelated incident, Judge Barnes was shot to death in his courtroom in 2005.

== Education and employment ==
Barnes attended Frankfurt High School in Germany and Lebanon Valley College in Annville, Pennsylvania, from which he graduated in 1962. He studied business and then law at George Washington University and then graduated from Emory University School of Law in Atlanta, Georgia, in 1972. At the time of his death, he held the title of adjunct professor at Emory. Barnes had served as a city judge and a magistrate before his appointment by Governor Zell Miller to the Fulton Superior Court in 1998.

== Murder ==
Barnes was murdered in his courtroom on March 11, 2005, by Brian Nichols, who was convicted for the crime and sentenced to life imprisonment. Nichols attacked a sheriff's deputy and was able to take her gun, and then went to the courtroom and shot Judge Barnes, his court reporter, and later a sheriff's deputy and a federal agent, all of whom died of their injuries. Nichols was taken into custody at an apartment complex in Duluth, Georgia, the following day.
