= Karlsruhe American High School =

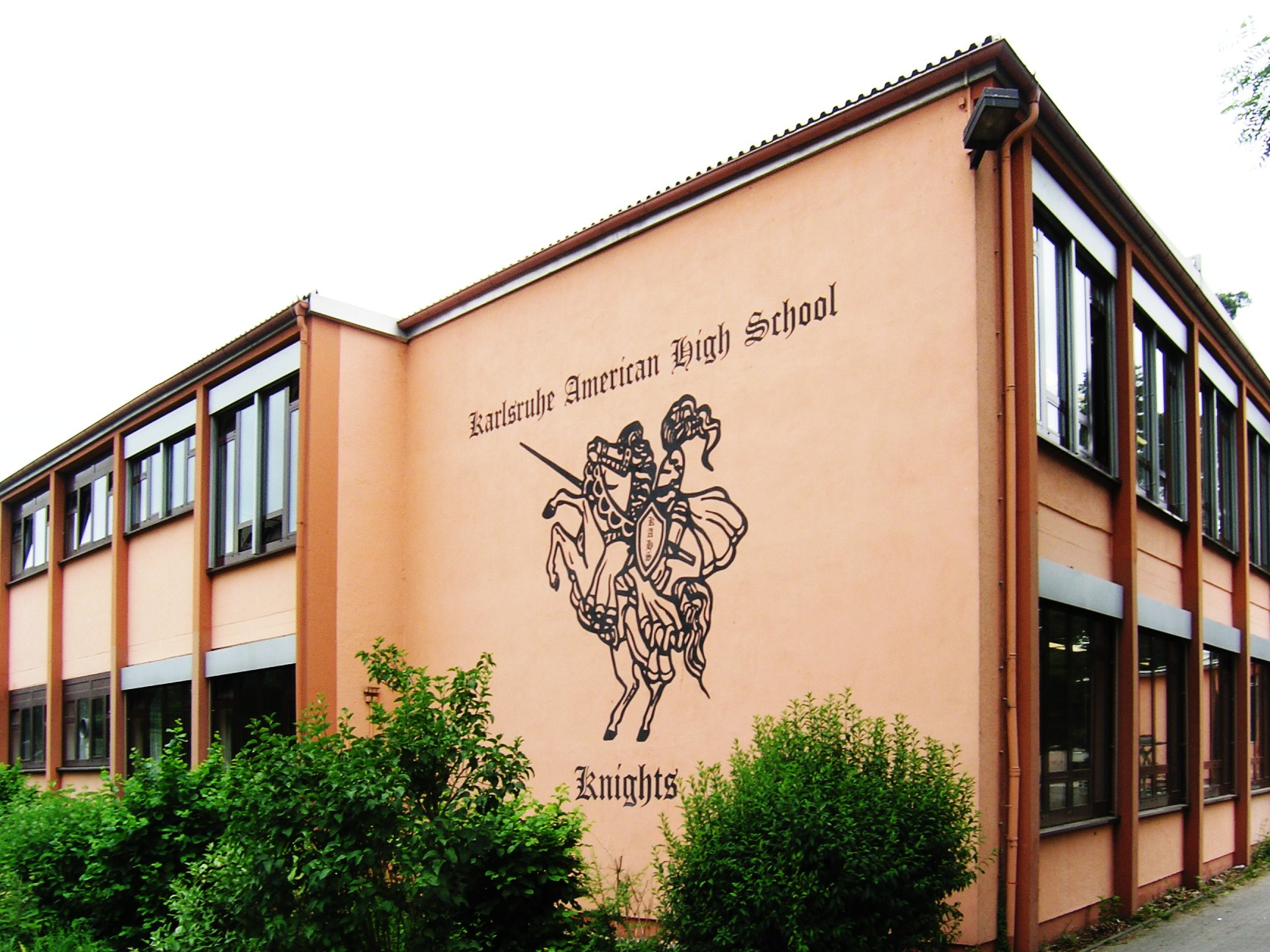

Location
- Paul Revere Village; Karlsruhe; Germany
- Coordinates: 49.025810°N 8.389558°E

Information
- School type: Department of Defense Dependents Schools
- Established: 1958
- Status: Closed
- Closed: June 1995
- Grades: 7-12
- Colors: Black and white
- Mascot: Knights
- Newspaper: Knight Life
- Yearbook: Der Kavalier

Karlsruhe American High School (KAHS) was an American DoDDS school in Paul Revere Village, a U.S. military housing area in Karlsruhe Germany. The school opened in fall 1958 with 200 students and 25 graduating seniors. Clyde R. Born was the first principal.

The school was closed in June 1995 with 100 students and 15 graduating seniors. After 1995, the school buildings were initially used by the senior classes of the German high school in nearby Neureut while their own buildings were being renovated. The school has been renamed to Heisenberg-Gymnasium.

== Alumni Association ==
The school has a very active alumni association. Members have organized many reunions in various cities around the United States, usually of all years rather than for individual classes. In September 2015, former students returned to Karlsruhe for an all-years reunion celebrating the 20th anniversary of the last graduating class.

The KAHS Alumni Association raised funds to install a plaque honoring former students of Karlsruhe American High School. The plaque was unveiled during a ceremony at the 2015 All Years reunion in Karlsruhe.

== Notable students and graduates ==
- Paula Boggs, attorney, retired, Starbucks, musician
- Gary Born, attorney, Wilmer Hale

== Reunions ==
- 1974 Springfield, MA (Thanksgiving) est. attendance = (10)
- 1975 Springfield, MA (Thanksgiving) (10)
- 1976 College Park, MD (Thanksgiving) (40)
- 1977 MD suburbs of DC (Thanksgiving) (45)
- 1978 Montclair, NJ (Thanksgiving) (10)
- 1985 Williamsburg, VA (50)
- 1987 Tampa, FL
- 1988 (70s era) Martinsburg, WV (60)
- 1990 New Orleans, LA (first reunion with both 1960s & 1970s attendees) (200)
- 1993 Houston, TX (85)
- 1995 Karlsruhe, Germany (including closing ceremonies for the school) (55)
- 1997 Denver, CO
- 1998 Houston, TX
- 1998 San Diego, CA (90)
- 1999 San Francisco, CA
- 2000 Austin, TX (90)
- 2003 Asheville, NC (85)
- 2005 Colorado Springs, CO (140)
- 2006 Atlanta, GA (145)
- 2012 Falls Church, VA (75)
- 2015 Karlsruhe, Germany (70)
- 2016 (60s & 70s) Southport, NC (40)
- 2017 San Antonio, TX (Oct 5-9)
- 2020 Denver, CO (Oct 1-4)
