= Nürnberg American High School =

Nürnberg American High School (NAHS)

Location
- Fürth; Germany; 49.456615°N 10.992778°E

Information
- School type: Department of Defense Dependents Schools
- Established: 1946
- Status: Closed
- Closed: 1995
- Grades: 7–12
- Colors: Green and White
- Mascot: Eagle
- Newspaper: The Army Brat (1946–1953), The Trichter(1953–1986)
- Yearbook: Annual ('47), The Voyager ('48), Voyager/Erinnerungen ('49–'55), Nürnberg/Erinnerungen, ('56–'60), The Eagle's Nest ('61–'66), The Franconian ('78–'92)

Nürnberg American High School (NAHS) was a Department of Defense Dependents Schools (DoDDS) system school located near Nuremberg, Germany. One of the original five DoDDS high schools in Germany, the school served the children of American military, government and civilian personnel from 1946 until its closing in 1995.

== History ==
In October 1946, only a year and a half after the Allied forces defeated Nazi Germany, American dependents of high school age in the Nuremberg area began school in a former private residence in Erlangen, a university town nearby.

The freshmen met in the dining room, the sophomores in the living room, and the juniors and seniors had classes upstairs in bedrooms, according to Ed Thompson, who was there as a freshman student. About 70 students were enrolled. After Thanksgiving, classes were moved into the Science Building at Erlangen University.

Though textbooks and supplies were hard come by, the faculty of eight and a teaching principal offered the core curriculum of the time. The students responded to their straitened circumstances by writing a constitution for their student council, organizing student assemblies, and holding a number of dances, including that staple of American high schools, the junior-senior prom. Beginning in January 1947, the students had a weekly mimeographed newspaper and ended the year by publishing a mimeographed yearbook. During the spring, some students had an unusual educational opportunity in that they took field trips to sessions of the Nuremberg Trials.

In June, all the seniors in the five high schools in Germany (about 100 students) were given a cruise down the Rhine, a tradition that continued for several years. Eight students graduated that first year in a combined ceremony with Munich American High School held at the Haus der Kunst in Munich.

In the fall of 1947, the school moved to Tannenstraße 19 in Fürth, a town approximately 6.5 miles from the Nuremberg main railway station, and changed its name to Nürnberg American High School.

A former German girls school built in 1906, the building on Tannenstraße offered facilities superior to those in Erlangen. It had a gymnasium, a large assembly room, and a large basement with a dining hall and a combination library and study hall. Nearby requisitioned three-story private homes served as dormitories.

Other facilities available to the students were a teenage club housed in the Stadttheater Fürth; Linde Stadium, an ice skating and swimming facility built by Nazi Germany for the 1936 Olympics; and Stein Castle, requisitioned from the Faber-Castell family, which was the scene of the junior-senior prom.

A German-American Youth Club encouraged interaction with the local populace. At one program in the Nuremberg Opera House, junior Don Hilty recited a speech originally given by Abraham Lincoln to a group of Germans in Ohio in 1861. Other programs included general knowledge quiz contests between the Americans and Germans and visits to each other's schools.

Enrollment remained low with approximately 70 students in grades 9-12. In June of its second year (1948), only four seniors graduated at the Haus der Kunst.

During the next three years, while enrollment hovered around 100, interaction with the German populace continued to be a fairly important part of school life. The Nuremberg Opera House was the scene of a dance of 500 German and American youth and a forum discussing "World Federation." The Nuremberg Special Services, assisted by a number of NAHS boys and girls, presented a musical production, “Rhapsody in Rhythm,” to a full house.

By the end of its fifth year, the Dependents School Service was able to claim that the courses of study, textbooks, and teaching supplies in the American schools in Germany compared favorably with the best in the United States. The U.S. Army remained the army of occupation, and military police guarded the school doors, often riding buses and trains when American youth traveled to and from school. American young people moved about freely and without fear, so reports one NAHS alumnus who was there in the 1950–51 school year

With the signing of the Deutschlandvertrag in 1952, the U.S. occupation in Germany ended, and the countries became allies. The requisitioned building at Tannenstraße 19 was returned to the Germans, and the U.S. built a brand new school at Fronmüllerstraße 30, complete with an adjacent dormitory. It opened January 3, 1952. At the same time, American dependents began to leave their housing “on the economy” and move into newly built housing around schools or U.S. bases. By 1955, the Kalb Community had grown up around NAHS, and the campus boasted five additional buildings, including a new gymnasium. After this year, interaction with the native populace became a minor part of school life and remained so throughout the rest of the time NAHS was open.

Throughout the first decade of its existence, NAHS enrollment averaged 120 and an average of 19 seniors graduated. From 1956 to 1957, enrollment went over 200 for the first time to 207, and there were 27 graduates. A year later, the enrollment had jumped another 100 students to 312.

After 49 years, the school closed in June 1995. Since the end of the Cold War in 1990, American military presence in Germany has been declining, and troops withdrew from the Nuremberg area.

== Military Communities Served ==
The communities served varied from year to year as military bases and schools opened and closed. In 1946–47, the military communities served were Amberg, Ansbach, Bad Kissingen, Bamberg, Bayreuth, Giebelstadt, Grafenwohr, Kitzingen, Nürnberg, Regensburg, Schweinfurt, Straubing, Weiden, and Würzburg. In 1957-58 the communities served were Amberg, Ansbach, Bamberg, Bayreuth. Crailsheim, Erlangen, Fürth, Grafenwohr, Herzo, Hohenfels, Illesheim, Nürnberg, Rothenberg, Schwabach, Schwäbisch Hall, and Vilseck.

== Dorm Life ==
Any student who lived more than 50 miles from the school lived in nearby residence facilities during the school week and went home for the weekend.

Facilities for resident students were primitive the first year. According to freshman Ed Thompson, the boys lived in an old barracks at the Erlangen Air Force base, sleeping on G.I. cots. They had hot water but no other heat. During this time, senior Sherrill Fetzer became “renowned for starting a fire in a metal waste can in an effort to keep warm”. The boys were later moved into a private residence.

The girls lived in a private residence. Junior Peggy Segur Misch remembered the bitter cold of that first year: "Getting hot water for bathing was a problem. A gas heater had to be turned on to heat the bath water. Because there was danger of asphyxiation from the heater, the window in the bathroom had to be wide open while the water was being heated – so it was hot water but cold air." She said the girls bathed only twice a week.

In the beginning, the residents dined in the U.S. Army mess hall at Erlangen. Ed Thompson said, “The girls sure did get the once-over by all the G.I.s.” Music during dining was often provided. During his first meal there, Thompson recalled that a German girl sang “Sentimental Journey.” Later, meals were served at a German hotel, the Kaiserhof. Freshman Bub Kale described the food as “mostly just to look at – it looks good but doesn't always taste that way”.

Conditions improved with the move to Fürth in 1947. The dormitory students lived about three blocks from the school in two large three-story private homes, with two to four persons per room depending on their size. They had a common social room, and meals were served in the basement of the school building.

Both dormitories had adult supervisors. Freshman Sara Davis Rodgers vividly recalled her dorm supervisor Miss Margaret Mason, an English woman. She was known for insisting on open windows no matter the weather and a rigid bath schedule, with each bath allotted “a certain time, in a certain amount of water, and for a specified time.” The morning wake-up call was especially memorable, with the American national anthem played over loudspeakers at full volume. “If your feet hadn't hit the floor and you weren't in an upright position immediately, Miss Mason was in your room berating you: 'Stand up you unpatriotic daughter of a rich American Army officer.' The loudspeakers then played 'I'm Looking over a Four Leaf Clover.' ”

Later, the dorm was relocated to the school campus and was co-ed, with boys housed on one side of the building and girls on the opposite. The areas were separated by a large room with couches, stereo speakers, and pool and foosball tables.

== Notable people ==
- Warren M. Robbins (teacher), founder and director emeritus Smithsonian National Museum of African Art, director of Center for Cross-Cultural Communication.
- James Clapper, Lt. General in U.S. Air Force and former U.S. Director of National Intelligence.
- Herbert J. Barker, U.S. Navy Commander, Collegiate Associate Professor at University of Maryland, University College, Episcopal Missionary to Republic of Taiwan.
- Dianne Wiest, actress on stage and screen.
- Jay Beckenstein, saxophone player and co-founder of Spyro Gyra.
- Elba Serrano, Professor of Neuroscience at New Mexico State University and winner of the Presidential Award for Excellence in Science, Mathematics, and Engineering Mentoring.
- Stuart Diamond, professor at University of Pennsylvania, author, 1987 Pulitzer Prize-winning journalist at The New York Times.
