= Bonn International School =

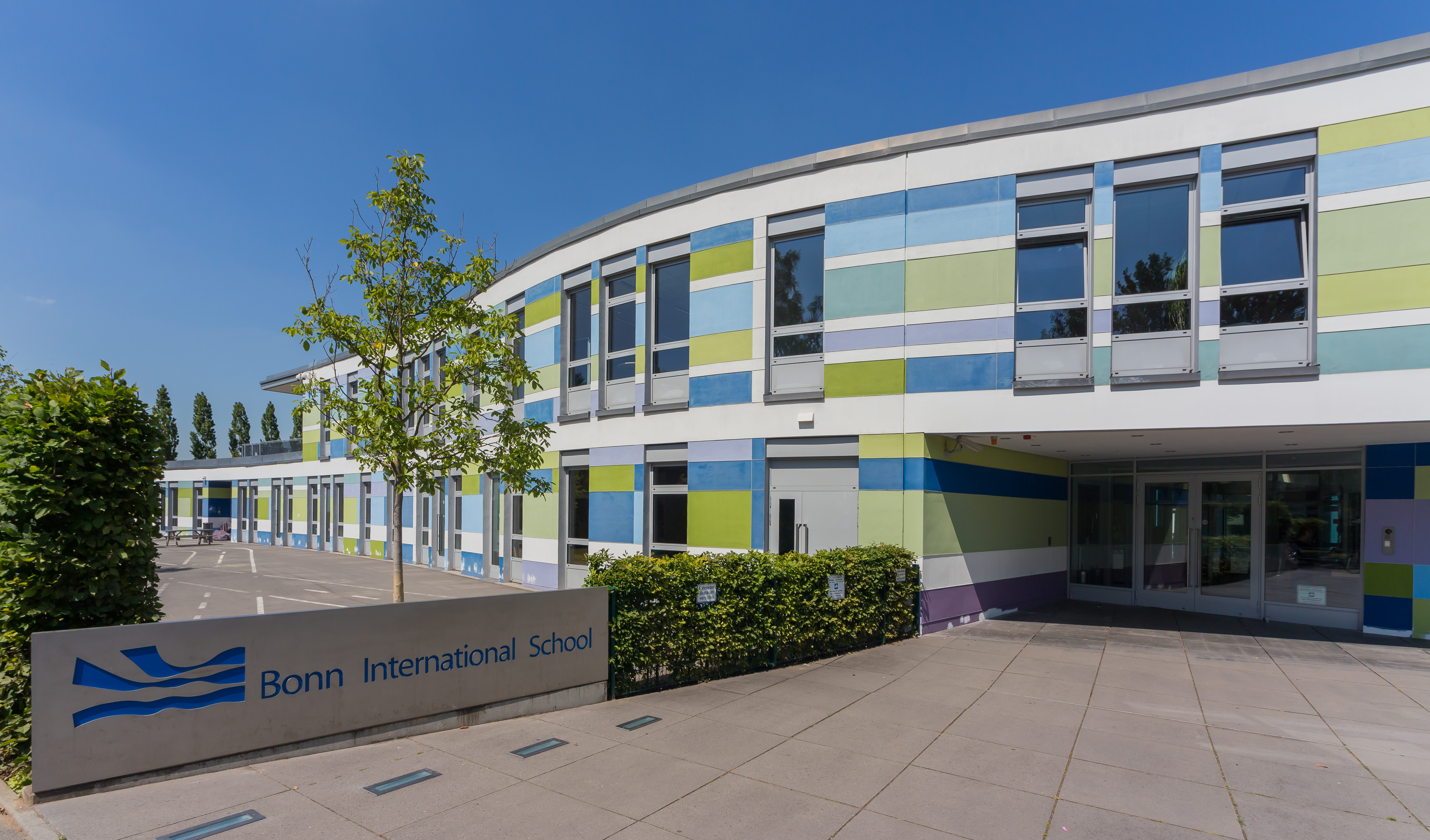

Location
- Martin-Luther-King-Str. 14; 53175 Bonn; Germany
- 50.7051°N 7.1609°E

Information
- Type: Private
- Motto: Inspire. Empower. Achieve.
- Established: 1997; 29 years ago
- Director: Kathleen Naglee
- Principal: Alex Whitaker
- Principal: Peter Owen
- Staff: 160
- Faculty: 110 teachers and teacher assistants
- Grades: Ages 3–18 years
- Enrolment: 800
- Campus type: Closed
- Athletics conference: ISAA, NECIS
- Mascot: BIS Dragon
- Affiliation: IBO, CIS and NEASC Accredited
- Board of Trustees Chair: Anna Spinelli
- Website: https://www.bonn-is.de/

Bonn International School (BIS) is a private international school based in Bonn, Germany. It is a non-profit organization, and is managed by a board of trustees. Members of the board include BIS parents, as well as faculty working at BIS. BIS currently has 800 students, ages ranging from 3 to 18 years and coming from 80 countries. Countries include Germany, the United States of America, the United Kingdom, France, Spain, Italy, the Netherlands, China, India, Canada, Japan, South Korea, and Australia.

== History ==
Bonn International School was founded in 1997 as a result of the merger of the former Bonn American High School, American Elementary School and British High School. The roots of these three schools in Bonn go back 65 years, making BIS one of the oldest schools in the city.

== Curriculum ==
BIS is an IB World School and offers the programmes of the International Baccalaureate (IB) for all ages, including International Baccalaureate Primary Years Programme (PYP), International Baccalaureate Middle Years Programme (MYP) and the IB Diploma Programme (DP). In addition to optional external IB examinations, each student is required to study for the BIS High School Diploma. BIS make the option to sit PSAT and SAT examinations available for students at regular intervals. Pastoral counseling, university advisory services and special learning needs support are available.

=== Accreditation ===
BIS is fully accredited by the International Baccalaureate Organization and New England Association of Schools and Colleges (NEASC).

== Facilities ==
The campus consists of three buildings: the "Waves" (built in 2005), the "Agora" (built in 2012) and the "Crest" (built in 2016/17). The campus includes a media center library, design and technology center with laboratory and workshops, well-equipped science laboratories, art and music rooms, two competition sized sports halls, a cafeteria and extensive fenced playgrounds. All classrooms have either smart boards or an interactive Apple TV device. BIS does not provide transportation services.
