= Burnsville Alternative High School =

Alternative High School in Eagan, Minnesota

Location
- 2140 Diffley Road; Eagan, Minnesota 55122; United States
- Coordinates: 44.8053°N 93.2166°W

Information
- Other names: BAHS, Cedar Alternative High School
- Type: Public alternative high school
- School district: Burnsville–Eagan–Savage School District 191
- NCES School ID: 270729000481
- Principal: Eugene (Gene) Roczniak
- Teaching staff: 14.32 (on an FTE basis)
- Grades: 10–12
- Enrollment: 176 (2023-2024)
- Student to teacher ratio: 12.29
- Colors: Black and Gold
- Newspaper: BAHS News Magazine
- Website: bahs.isd191.org

Burnsville Alternative High School (BAHS) is a public alternative high school in Eagan, Minnesota, United States. It is part of the Burnsville–Eagan–Savage School District 191.

Students do not have to be residents of the school district to attend, and is an option for students in tenth grade or older who have dropped out of their previous school setting. A Burnsville High School diploma is available to all students.

== Demographics ==
As of the 2017-18 School year there were 135 students attending Burnsville Alternative High School. 36% of students were Hispanic, 27% of students were White, 23% of students were Black, Asians made up 5%, and Native Americans were around 1% of the student population. 55% of students were male and 45% were female. 59% of students were eligible for free or reduced lunch.
