= Bromo adjacent homology domain containing 1 =

BAHD1

Identifiers
- Aliases: BAHD1, bromo adjacent homology domain containing 1
- External IDs: OMIM: 613880; MGI: 2139371; GeneCards: BAHD1

Gene location (Human)
Chr.	Chromosome 15 (human)
Band	15q15.1	Start	40,439,721 bp
Band	15q15.1	End	40,468,236 bp

Gene location (Mouse)
Chr.	Chromosome 2 (mouse)
Band	2|2 E5	Start	118,730,858 bp
Band	2|2 E5	End	118,755,009 bp
RNA expression pattern
Bgee	Human / Mouse (ortholog); Top expressed in: olfactory bulb; granulocyte; left adrenal cortex; right adrenal gland; skin of arm; right lobe of thyroid gland; right ovary; vena cava; left ovary; left lobe of thyroid gland / Top expressed in: superior cervical ganglion; mesenteric lymph nodes; otic vesicle; decidua; hand; yolk sac; otolith organ; epithelium of small intestine; spinal ganglia; utricle; More reference expression data
BioGPS	n/a
Gene ontology
Molecular function	chromatin binding; protein binding; transcription cis-regulatory region binding
Cellular component	chromatin; chromatin silencing complex; nucleus; nucleoplasm; chromosome
Biological process	negative regulation of transcription, DNA-templated; heterochromatin assembly; regulation of transcription, DNA-templated; transcription, DNA-templated; chromatin organization
Sources:Amigo / QuickGO
Orthologs
Databases	NCBI: entry; OMA: entry
Species	Human	Mouse
Entrez	22893	228536
Ensembl	ENSG00000140320	ENSMUSG00000040007
UniProt	Q8TBE0	Q497V6
RefSeq (mRNA)	NM_001301132; NM_014952	NM_001045523
RefSeq (protein)	NP_001288061; NP_055767	n/a
Location (UCSC)	Chr 15: 40.44 – 40.47 Mb	Chr 2: 118.73 – 118.76 Mb
PubMed search
- Wikidata
View/Edit Human	View/Edit Mouse

Bromo adjacent homology domain containing 1 (BAHD1) is a protein that in humans is encoded by the BAHD1 gene. BAHD1 is involved in heterochromatin formation and transcriptional repression.

== Discovery ==
BAHD1 was first cloned from a human brain cDNA library and the coding sequence was named KIAA0945. Bierne and colleagues further discovered the function of BAHD1 in the regulation of chromatin structure and gene expression.

== Function ==
BAHD1 acts as a co-repressor by interacting with a set of proteins that promote chromatin compaction and regulate transcription. Tandem-affinity purification of the BAHD1-associated protein complex in human HEK293 cells identified MIER proteins (MIER1, MIER2, MIER3), histone deacetylase HDAC1 and HDAC2, histone H3K9 methyltransferase EHMT2, heterochromatin protein 1 (HP1 alpha, HP1 beta, HP1 gamma), MBD1, TRIM28 and CDYL as partners of BAHD1. Overexpression of BAHD1 in HEK293 cells induces large-scale chromatin condensation and DNA methylation on autosomes. The C-terminal BAH domain of BAHD1 acts as a reader for the epigenetic mark H3K27me3. Ectopically expressed BAHD1 colocalizes with the heterochromatic inactive X chromosome (Xi).

== Animal studies ==
Ablation of the Bahd1 gene in the mouse alters placental development and results in hypocholesterolemia, hypoglycemia and decreased body fat. Bahd1-haplodeficiency in mice decreases the efficiency of infection with the bacterial pathogen Listeria monocytogenes.

== Clinical significance ==
During infection of human epithelial cells with the pathogen Listeria monocytogenes, BAHD1 represses interferon-stimulated genes. At specific stages of infection, a Listeria nucleomodulin, LntA, acts as an inhibitor of BAHD1 and activates interferon-stimulated genes. The BAHD1 gene is downregulated in the colon tissue in a mouse model of ulcerative colitis.
