= Bavaria District (DoDDS-Europe) =

DoDDS-Europe Bavaria District

Location
- Southern Germany Germany

District information
- Type: DoDEA
- Grades: K-12
- Schools: 15

Other information
- Website: www.dodea.edu/Europe/Bavaria/index.cfm

DoDEA-Europe Bavaria District is a school district headquartered in Germany that includes DoDEA schools located in the southwestern German states of Bavaria and Baden-Württemberg.

== Schools ==
Ansbach Community

- Ansbach Elementary School

Garmisch Community

- Garmisch Elementary/Middle School

Grafenwoehr Community

- Grafenwoehr Elementary School
- Netzaberg Elementary School
- Netzaberg Middle School
- Vilseck Elementary School
- Vilseck High School

Hohenfels Community

- Hohenfels Elementary School
- Hohenfels Middle/High School

Stuttgart Community

- Patch Elementary School
- Patch Middle School
- Robinson Barracks Elementary School
- Stuttgart Elementary School
- Stuttgart High School
