= Burnsville–Eagan–Savage School District =

School district in Minnesota

Coordinates: 44°47′05″N 93°15′57″W

Location in the state of Minnesota.

Burnsville–Eagan–Savage is an independent school district in the U.S. state of Minnesota; it serves the city of Burnsville and parts of the neighboring cities of Savage and Eagan.

== Profile ==
The school district educates more than 10,000 students across 14 schools, and is the 12th largest school district in the state of Minnesota. Data released in August, 2008 showed that students in the school district scored above the state average on the MCA-II science test at all levels tested – 5th grade, 8th grade and at Burnsville High School. Burnsville High School students scored above the state and national averages on the ACT college admissions test. The average composite score for students increased by 0.7 points from 22.7 to 23.4, placing them above the state average (22.6) and the national average (21.1). The school district also organizes classes for adults, including Adult Basic Education, English Language Classes and General Educational Development.

The district has made a commitment to reduce its energy costs, in partnership with the Schools for Energy Efficiency program and the US government's Energy Star program. Through low- or no-cost approaches, the district has made major costs savings and reductions in carbon emissions in the last four years. The School Board has recently been considering plans to create a series of magnet schools, which would include a fine-arts and performing-arts school housed in the new Performing Arts Center in Burnsville.

== Demographics ==
As of the 2009-10 school year, there were 9,864 students attending school in the district. In terms of race, white students made up 63% of the district's student population. Among students of color, black students made up 17% of the student population, and Hispanic and Asian students made up 10% and 9% of the student populace respectively. The remaining students are American Indian. Students with limited English proficiency consisted of 16% of the district's student population. Students with special education needs consisted of 13% of the district's student population. Roughly 35% of the students attending school in the district are eligible for free or reduced priced lunch.

According to the Burnsville–Eagan–Savage School District website, fifty-seven languages are spoken by the students.

== Schools ==
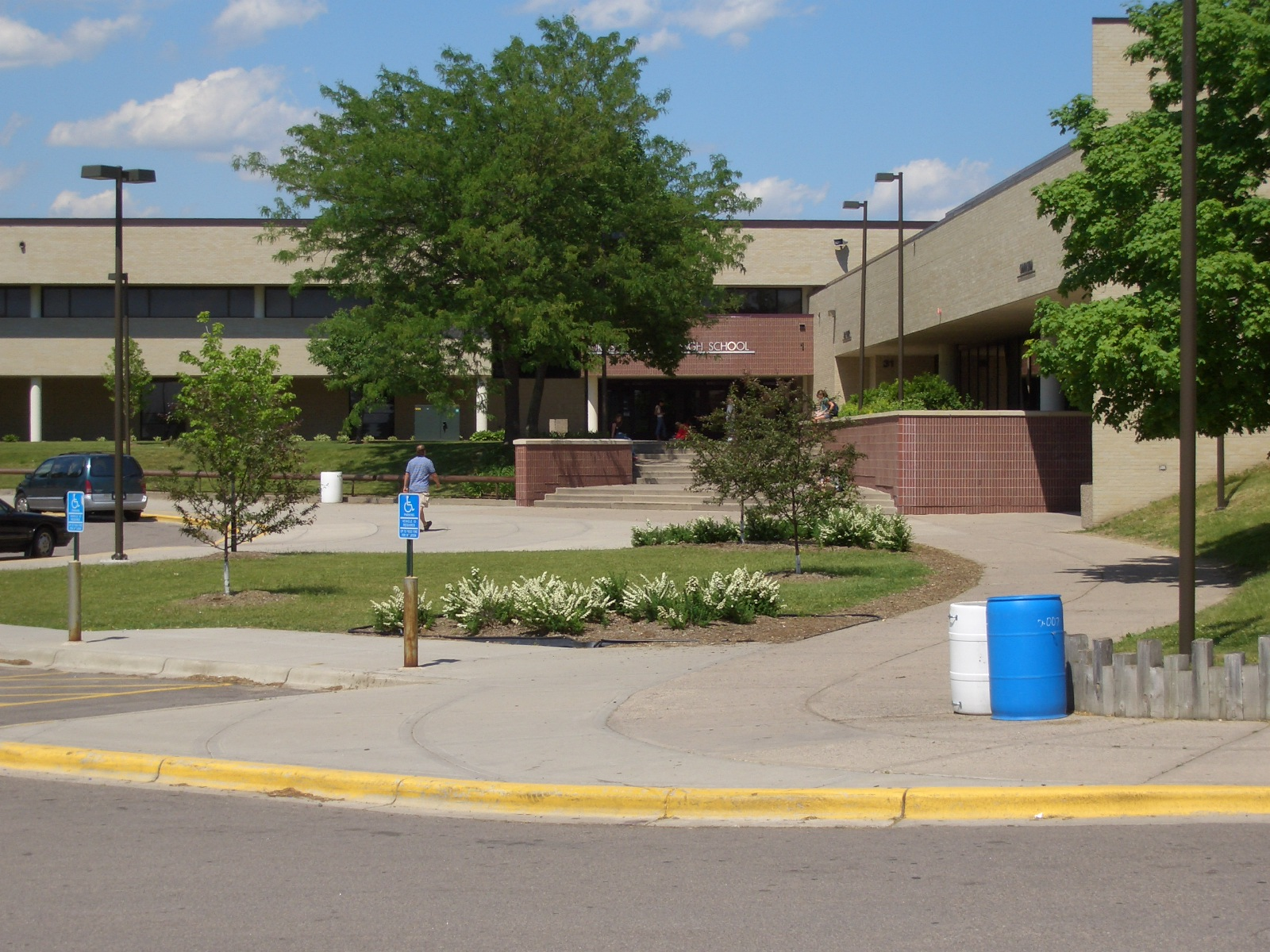
Burnsville High School front entrance

The school district currently includes one 9-12 high school, two 6-8 middle schools and ten K-5 elementary schools.

=== High schools ===
- Burnsville High School
- Burnsville Alternative High School (located in Eagan)

=== Middle schools ===
- Eagle Ridge Middle School (located in Savage)
- Joseph Nicollet Middle School

=== Elementary schools ===
- Harriet Bishop (located in Savage), named after the suffragist, Harriet Bishop
- Edward D. Neill
- Gideon Pond
- Hidden Valley (located in Savage)
- Rahn (located in Eagan)
- Sky Oaks. The school hosts a student population that differs significantly from the district it serves; it's the only minority-majority elementary school in the city of Burnsville. Approximately 31% of the students have limited English proficiency, 14% are in special education services, and nearly half (49%) are eligible for free or reduced price lunch.
- Vista View
- William Byrne

== Former schools ==
- Metcalf Middle School
- Marion W. Savage (located in Savage) closed after the 2019-20 school year due to funding
- Sioux Trail Elementary School closed in 2020.
