= Hannah Valantine =

Professor of Cardiovascular Medicine

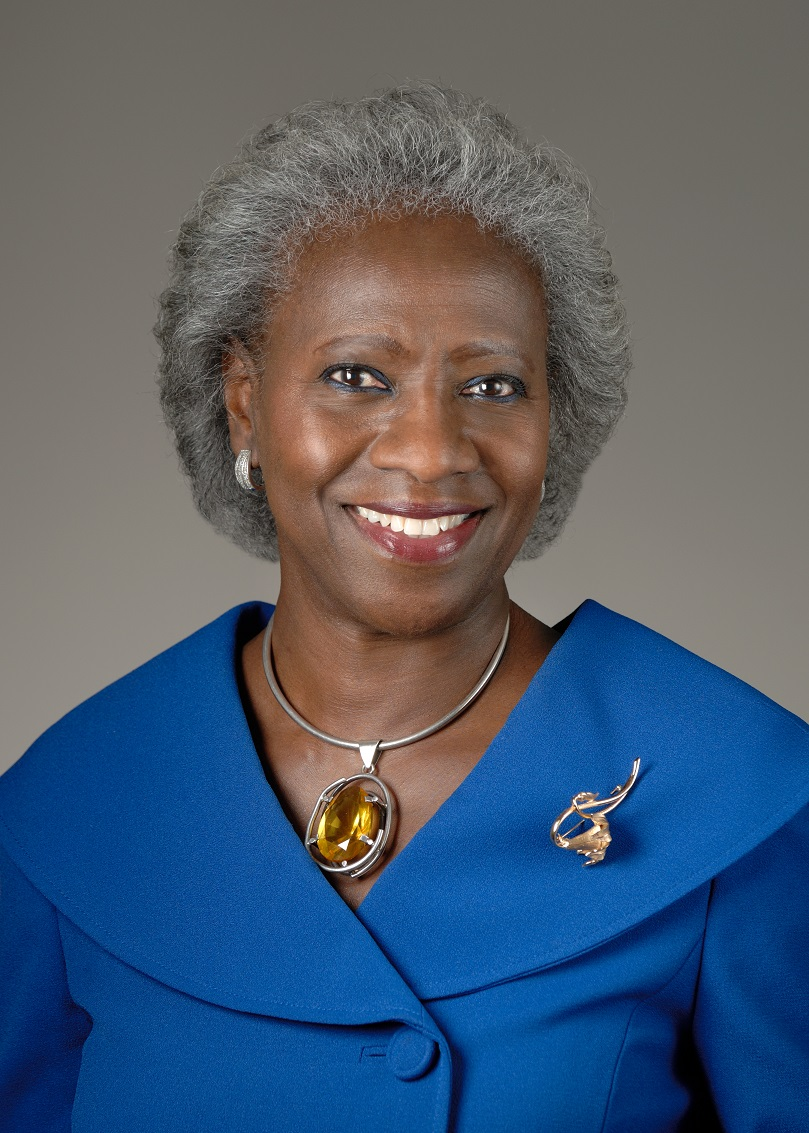
- Hannah Valantine in 2020
- Born: The Gambia
- Education: MBBS, St. George's Hospital Medical School
- Occupation: National Institutes of Health Chief Officer for Scientific Workforce Diversity

Hannah A. Valantine is the Chief Officer for Scientific Workforce Diversity at the United States National Institutes of Health.

== Biography ==
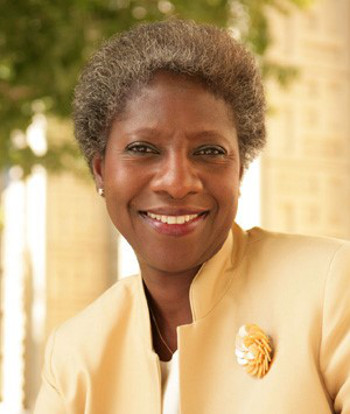
Hannah Valantine in 2014.

Valantine was born in The Gambia and lived in Banjul as a child. When her father was selected as the Gambian High Commissioner to the United Kingdom, she and her family moved to London. She studied biochemistry at Chelsea College, London University and graduated from medical school at St. George's Hospital Medical School in 1978.

== Career ==
After medical school Valantine performed post-graduate work in cardiology at the Brompton Hospital and Hammersmith Hospital in London. She recalls that her decision to enter this field elicited skepticism from colleagues, as only two other women cardiologists worked in the UK at the time. After her residencies in the U.K., she became a fellow at Stanford and worked with Norman Shumway, a pioneer in the field of heart transplants. She became a professor of cardiovascular medicine at the Stanford University School of Medicine in 1989 and reached full professor rank in 2001.

Valantine became SUMC's Senior Associate Dean for Diversity and Faculty Development in 2005. On taking this role, she cited the importance of mentorship and social engagement in developing the careers of young faculty and emphasized her experience as a working mother in shaping her advice to young scientists. During the 2009–10 academic year, Valantine was a Faculty Research Fellow at Stanford's Clayman Institute for Gender Research. She was selected in 2010 as one of six recipients of NIH Pathfinder Awards, which were intended for the study of women's underrepresentation in biomedical faculty positions in the United States.

Valantine describes her pursuit of innovation as the foundation of her professional career - innovation in heart transplant and innovation in efforts to diversify the biomedical research workforce.

== NIH leadership ==
In 2014, NIH Director Francis Collins announced Valantine's appointment as NIH's first Chief Officer for Scientific Workforce Diversity, a new position whose entire focus is diversity in biomedicine. Among her accomplishments in this position is the 2014 award of nearly $31 million to develop methods for outreach and career development targeted toward members of demographic groups underrepresented among professional scientists.

Under Valantine's leadership, the racial gap in rates of NIH applications and awards to projects led by African-American researchers has been practically, and in some cases entirely, eliminated, with increases of up to 142% in some award areas. Similar trends are apparent for Hispanic/Latinx scientists. Valantine also developed the NIH Distinguished Scholars Program, which aims to increase diversity among tenure-track researchers in intramural research programs. This program reduces barriers to recruitment of cohorts of principal investigators from underrepresented groups in biomedical research such as people of color, individuals with disabilities, and women.

Valantine also leads the Laboratory of Transplantation Genomics at the National Heart, Lung, and Blood Institute in Bethesda, Maryland, focusing on heart transplant rejection.
