= Nucleomodulin =

Agrobacterium tumefaciens (A) targets the nucleus of a plant cell (D) during an infection.

Nucleomodulins are a family of bacterial proteins that enter the nucleus of eukaryotic cells.

This term comes from the contraction between "nucleus" and "modulins", which are microbial molecules that modulate the behaviour of eukaryotic cells. Nucleomodulins are produced by pathogenic or symbiotic bacteria. They act on various processes in the nucleus: remodelling of the chromatin structure, transcription, splicing of pre-messenger RNA, cell division.

The identification of nucleomodulins in several species of bacterial pathogens of humans, animals and plants has led to the emergence of the concept that direct control of the nucleus is one of the most sophisticated strategies used by microbes to bypass host defences. Nucleomodulins can be directly secreted into the intracellular medium after entry of the bacteria into the cell, like Listeria monocytogenes, or they can be injected from the extracellular medium or intracellular organelles using a type III or IV bacterial secretion system, also known as a "molecular syringe".

More recently, it has been shown that some of them, such as YopM from Yersinia pestis and IpaH9.8 from Shigella flexneri, can autonomously penetrate eukaryotic cells thanks to a membrane transduction domain.

The diversity of molecular mechanisms triggered by nucleomodulins is a source of inspiration for new biotechnologies. They are true nano-machines capable of hijacking a multitude of nuclear processes. In research, nucleomodulins are the subject of in-depth studies that have led to the discovery of new human nuclear regulators, such as the epigenetic regulator BAHD1.

== Examples ==
Agrobacterium tumefaciens, responsible for crown gall disease, produces an arsenal of Vir proteins, including VirD2 and VirE2, enabling the precise integration of a piece of its DNA, called T-DNA, into that of the host plant

Listeria monocytogenes, responsible for listeriosis, can modulate the expression of immunity genes. One of the mechanisms at play involves the bacterial protein LntA, which inhibits the function of the epigenetic regulator BAHD1. The action of this nucleomodulin is associated with chromatin decompaction and activation of an interferon response genes.

Shigella flexneri, responsible for shigellosis, secretes the IpaH9.8 protein targeting a mRNA splicing protein that disrupts the production of protein isoforms and the inflammatory response in humans.

Legionella pneumophila, responsible for legionellosis, secretes an enzyme with histone methyltransferase activity capable of methylating histones at different chromosome loci or at the level of ribosomal DNA (rDNA) in the nucleolus.
