= Munich American High School =

Coordinates: 48°5′39″N 11°36′1″E

Munich American High School (MAHS)
- Munich, Bavaria APO NY 09407; Germany

Information
- School type: Department of Defense Dependents Schools
- Established: 1946
- Status: Closed
- Closed: 1992
- Grades: 9–12 except for the later years/1977–1992 it was 7–12
- Colors: Blue and white
- Mascot: Mustang
- Yearbook: Annual – First published in 1948

Munich American High School (MAHS) was a Department of Defense Dependents Schools (DoDDS) system school located in Munich, Germany, on Cincinnatistrasse. MAHS was open from 1946 to 1992.

== History ==
Munich American High School was established to serve the US military in the Southern Bavarian region after World War II. The school is located in the Perlacher Forst area of Munich. One of DoDDS original six high schools in Germany, the school served the children of American military, government and civilian personnel from 1946 until its closing in 1992.

School was for grades 7–12; grades 7–8 were considered Junior High School, but shared facilities as well as some teachers.

The school opened on October 15, 1946, and consisted of two large adjacent houses – one for grades K-8 and the other for grades 9–12. The high school was originally located at Holzkirchnerstrasse 2 (formerly the Lehmann-Villa) before moving to an old school house on Rotbuchenstrasse a year and a half after opening. The high school opened with 47 students, but grew rapidly and was short of supplies. Mr. Rex Gleason taught the students, but also supervised 18 boys in the school dormitory. Mr. Rex Gleason had the help of four other teachers to assist in the teaching duties. Army field tables served as desks; plywood, painted black, was a chalk board; paper was at a premium and students did assignments on paper bags from the commissary; and Army education manuals served as math texts. Munich seniors attended the Dachau War Crimes trials as part of their studies. Sixteen seniors graduated in the first class on July 14, 1947.

The Army requisitioned and repaired an old German school (formerly the Hans-Schemm-Schule) on Rotbuchenstrasse and the Americans moved into that in 1948, leaving the very overcrowded houses on Holzkirchnerstrasse. The old school became the location of the "German Youth Activities Program". A German elementary school shared the complex, which included a gym and auditorium. Rex Gleason asked the custodian to remove some wall decorations on each side of the stage, but underneath were black swastikas; the decorations were immediately put back. The Munich American HS class of 1948 published the first yearbook overseas.

The exact count of students varies. Lt. Col. Terrance Fox states the first class in 1946 had 32 students with a graduating class of 16. By 1952 there were 200 students with a graduating class of 32. More than 800 students attended MAHS between 1947 and 1953.

The first school had no library, no lunchroom, no laboratories and that out of the 12 males in the first class, eight of them became officers in the Armed Forces. The 1946 to 1947 senior class started with eight students and doubled to 16 before the end of the school year. The curriculum was basic – a minimum of mathematics, history, science, and German taught by a local resident.

Mr. Rex Gleason became principal of the school in 1947, and remained in Munich until 1968, overseeing the building of a new school complex which opened in the Perlacher Forst area of Munich in January 1956. By the time Rex Gleason left, there were two elementary schools in Munich and MAHS had nearly 1,200 students.

The school on Rotbuchenstrasse 85 still exists and is now the Rotbuchenschule. In the basement are still remnants of when Americans were using the school.

A fine example of modern architecture in post-war Munich was the US school center at the housing area Cincinattistrasse / General-Kalb-Weg in suburban Perlach. The housing area had been built in the 1950s by Karl Loibl, Hans A. Endres, Immanuel Kroeker, Otto Roth and Carl Kergl and included a cinema, a PX store and a hamburger restaurant. Not only had the school been built after the modern concept of age-specific environments – small buildings for the 60 children in primary school and larger buildings for the 30 children in secondary – but had all the amenities like recreational rooms and a cafeteria – then unknown in German schools. The friendly and light original architecture has been heavily modified between 1994 and 2003 and the characteristic 1950s interior decoration has been lost completely.

The high school (and elementary school) in Perlacher Forst opened on January 4, 1956. Cost of the construction of both schools was about DM 7,600,000. Exchange rate in 1956 was DM 4.20 to $1.

Outside MAHS are two statues. One is of a mustang, the school mascot, and the other is of an elephant. The elephant was always painted different colors by MAHS students. The story of the elephant, as told to Mr. Rex Gleason at the time: "when the school complex was being built, the US administration was Republican. The Germans believed all Americans were Republicans and brought the Elephant to the High School because they figured the Americans would appreciate the ode to the Republicans. Sometime later, the Elephant was moved to a site near the elementary school. But, the High Schoolers would have none of that. He was rescued and brought back to the High School. The mustang came after the elephant and was moved from the US housing area Neu Harlaching off of Tegernseerlandstrasse which leads to McGraw Kaserne. Tegernseerlandstrasse was being expanded in the early 1970s and was in the way of the pedestrian bridge being built to cross the road. The mustang was moved in two pieces to the high school in the early 1970s (probably 1972 or 1973) replacing an ox that stood for many years at MAHS. The ox was moved to Chiemsee Platz housing area adjacent to McGraw Kaserne. The idea for the swap was Colonel David Lee Waldron's and Mr. Joseph Frank Kolafa's, P.E.. Both the elephant and mustang still stand (as of 2013) in front of the school.

On June 15, 1951, Mrs. Marjorie Amos, wife of 1st Lt Carl Amos, of the Munich QM Depot, and mother of two young children graduated from MAHS. Mrs. Amos was attending the Marianna (Florida) High School when she met her husband. She left school in her junior year after marrying Amos, who served in the Marine Corps during World War II and received a direct commission' as a second lieutenant in the Army. Mrs. Amos' plans to finish her schooling in EUCOM were delayed by the arrival of her youngest child, but in September 1950 she entered the Munich Military Post (MMP) dependents' high school. Mrs. Amos joined her schoolmates in the high school operetta "Sailor Maids," and in activities of the teen-age club. Her husband helped her with housework and homework.

MAHS, in 1951, donated 100 books on English literature to a German boarding school at Neubeuren as part of the senior classes German American relations project.

In 1955, thirty-eight out of a total of 545 students in the Munich American High School made the first honor roll of the year, Mr. Rex Gleason, principal, said.

In March 1956, Munich students attended a parley on good leadership. Qualities of a good leader were outlined to more than 500 Munich American High School students at their third annual leadership conference in Munich. Dr. Raymond Hascell, assistant chief of USAREUR's dependents education education branch, gave the main address. Four discussion groups were convened following the address. Dr. P. C. McCoy, of the political science department of the University of Maryland in Munich, and Robert Zibell, an American Government instructor in the local high school, headed a group which discussed modification of parliamentary law. Qualities of a leader and responsibilities were discussed by a group headed by Mrs. Francis D. Saitta, of Munich, while Margaret Schwartz, Augsburg High School counselor, led a discussion on group organization and program planning. Mrs. Katherine Trull, counselor for the Munich American High School, headed the conference arrangements committee.

The actor Ryan O'Neal attended MAHS in 1959. however, he did not graduate. Ryan O'Neal went by the name Pat O'Neal while at MAHS.

Time Life magazine published a photo of students entering buses in 1960.

In 1961, the student count at MAHS was 1,062.

MAHS students staged "Oklahoma" at the America House on April 10, 1963. Curtain time was 7:30 pm. Earlier, the play was warmly received by capacity audiences at four performances in the high school.

The student council of MAHS wrote a letter of condolences to Mrs. John F. Kennedy on November 26, 1963. In the 1964 yearbook, it states that Senior Brian MacFarlane laid a wreath, on behalf of the MAHS student body, at the grave of President John F. Kennedy.

MAHS students staged "The Crucible" in the school auditorium in 1965. At the 'mock rehearsal' students turned the play into a musical and sang such songs as "Yellow Bird, Way Up on the Rafter There" and "I'm Getting Strung Up in the Morning."

From 1964 to 1966, MAHS presented an old English "M" to students that were on the honor roll three out of four marking periods in a school year. The letters were larger than the letters awarded for sports. In the following year, gold bars were added if the student continued to perform in the same fashion.

In February 1970, the Richard E. Steppler Memorial Scholarship was created. It is the first scholarship in the school's history to be named for a teacher. Richard Steppler was a Science teacher and died of a heart attack.

On March 9–11, 1971, MAHS staged the play L'il Abner. The show had a 53-member cast and 26 students involved in the production.

In May 1971, twenty students from MAHS went to Biarritz, France for a week to further their studies in the French language. The 20, selected by their classmates, stayed with French families during their visit and engulfed themselves completely in the country's language and culture. Mrs. Nancy Kuehler, the teacher who organized the visit, said the students did so well in school that semester that most of the 20 were almost fluent in French by May. "The entire class helped raise money for the trip," Mrs. Nancy Kuehler said, "although everyone knew only 20 would eventually be chosen". The class — which sponsored a teen fashion show, a can-can dance and a French pastry sale —raised more than $2,000 for the week-long visit.

Monica Patrick in 1975, a senior Munich American High School, won the Europe-wide American Legion oratory contest. Earlier Monica won the Munich and Germany wide contests. She won the Europe wide contest in Karlsruhe with a speech on "Civil Rights Aspects of the US Constitution".

Muhammad Ali, the boxer, visited MAHS in May 1976. Muhammad Ali was in Munich to fight England's Richard Dunn for the heavyweight title.

Sixteen MAHS music students won the Sonderpreis or special prize in a November 1976 music competition with 10 other groups chosen as finalists from schools in upper Bavaria and the Allgau regions of Germany. The uniqueness of the ensemble (16 youngsters swinging in the big band style of the late 40s and early 50s) caused the judges to stop comparing them with the other small rock combos and create a special prize. The contest was held at the Circus Krone with audience of 3,000. George Morrison, was the spokesman, leader and teacher of the group. Terry Mitchell (Senior) played sax, Carl Bitte (Junior) played trumpet, David Sanford (Junior) played drums.

Willy Wonka and the Chocolate Factory-1971, Rollerball (1975 film)-1975, Twilight's Last Gleaming-1977, and Brass Target-1978, The Great Escape −1963 were filmed in Munich in which students of MAHS were extras. Munich is the home of Bavaria Film.

Martin Paul of Munich American High School was selected laureate of DODEUSR's third annual Junior Science and Humanities Symposium at King's College In London. Paul's award-winning research paper was entitled "Correlations Between Smoking and Hemotological Disorders" and dealt with changes in blood composition when people begin or cease smoking.

George Stevens, principal at MAHS, called curriculum in DODDSEUR schools more advanced and varied than any he'd seen in the U.S. "As an example, the Munich American High School offers over 75 areas in the curriculum which is more than the combined offerings of the two high schools in my hometown", Stevens said.

In 1967, the actor Hal Holbrook performed his Mark Twain impression/story in the MHS auditorium.

Joe Namath, the football player, and Linda Evans, the actress, visited MAHS in May, 1978 while filming Avalanche Express.

In January 1979 the Munich PX, located adjacent to the school and opened in 1976, was declared off limits during noon hour (lunch) to MAHS students due to complaints. Students from outside Munich could bring a note from home and get a pass to shop at the PX.

Allegra Curtis, the daughter of actor Tony Curtis and German actress Christine Kaufmann, attended MAHS 1984–1985.

Drew Barrymore, the actress, visited MAHS in 1986 while filming Babes in Toyland (1986 film). Students of MAHS were extras in the movie.

The school had a cafeteria which was shared with the elementary school. The cafeteria provided lunch. In 1986, had 46 minutes for lunch each school day from 11:51 to 12:37 according to Thomas E. Rowley, principal, Munich American Elementary and High School. At some point in time the cafeteria was started to be run by AAFES. In 1979 it was already run by AAFES.

As an artifact, there exists a Munich American High locker door that was removed in the early 1980s. The number of the locker is 441. The locker was available at a MAHS 2007 reunion.

The last school performance of Munich American High School was March 1992 based on Les Misérables, Victor Hugo's novel of France in the early 19th century. Six students — Ryan Rothmaier (Senior), Emily Nelson (Senior), Chava Burshtein (Sophomore), Claire Foley (Senior), John Lovretta (Senior) and Susan Maroney (Senior) — worked on the script. A script was completed by the end of the first semester. A complex set was constructed. Open auditions were held, with class members assigning the roles. Rehearsals began in February. There were 27 cast members. Curtain calls started March 25 and fell March 27. Previous MAHS performances included Barefoot in the Park, Bye Bye Birdie, Flowers for Algernon and Nicholas Nickleby.

The last MAHS sophomore class of 1994, in 1992, has 40 students.

The school closed in June 1992 (at the end of the school year) after the US Army left Munich due to the end of the cold war. The school was returned to the Germans. MAHS along with the elementary and middle school is now part of the Schulzentrum Perlacher Forst housing different schools. The "Hauptschule an der Balanstraße" moved into the school in July 1996 after a complete renovation. Renovation was from August 1995 to July 1996 at cost of 11.1 million DM. Interesting to see that the home page for the school has the MAHS Mustang statue as the background (http://www.hscincin.musin.de/). The Städtische Berufsschule für Versicherungswesen is in the High School.

After the closure of Munich American High School, FC Bayern, a Munich Bundesliga soccer club, purchased the DoDDS adjacent sporting fields that previously held MAHS's football/soccer field and baseball field. A new grass field was placed over the existing football/soccer field while an artificial turf field was placed over the baseball diamond.

The dormitory, Post Exchange, and the neighboring buildings will be torn down to build an annex for the Europäische Schule München. A competition was held to determine the architectural design. Construction should be completed in 2015. Designs for the new German school:

- http://www.amisiedlung.de/geplanter-neubau-europ%C3%A4ische-schule/
- http://www.competitionline.com/de/wettbewerbe/71768 (click on the picture of the school to see additional pictures)

== Accreditation ==
MAHS was accredited by NCA now AdvancED. Bill Douglas was on the NCA Team reviewing Munich American High School.

== Dorm life ==
The school in Perlacher Forst had a dorm housing students from areas where a high school did not exist. Upper classmen lived on the ground floor. Juniors and Seniors stayed on the first floor. This rule may not have been in effect in the early days of the dorm. Students would return home for the weekend. Students moved into the dorm at Perlacher Forst in the 1954–1955 school year which was before the school was completed. Students took the bus from the dorm to the school on Rotbuchstrasse.

The first girls dormitory was located on Harthauserstrasse 15 and the boys dormitory was on Gabriel-Maxstrasse 70. The boys dorm was moved to Harthauserstasse 85 in 1949. In September 1946 there were 14 girls. Two years later there were 38 girls living in the 10 bedrooms. In October 1946, there were nine men in the dormitory and by September 1948 there were 42.

One former student remembers the dorm on Faistenbergerstrasse which was near the old schools. Students ate their meals and had nightly study hall at the old school. On Wednesday evenings the students were able to walk to the McGraw Kaserne for a movie.

Students ate breakfast, lunch and dinner in the MAHS cafeteria once in the new dorms at Perlacher Forst.

Students lived in the dormitory from communities that had no high school. Some of the communities served by MAHS are below. The communities served changed through the years as US military installations closed or opened.

- Garmisch
- Oberammergau
- Murnau
- Regensberg
- Bad Tolz
- Schwabing
- Friedberg
- Bad Aibling
- Furstenfeldbruck
- Landshut
- Straubing
- Aviano, Italy, students also attended this dorm due to the USAF base high school only going up to the 10th grade. 1973 to 1975)

Joseph C. D'Amato was the chief dormitory supervisor in 1965. 61 boys and 50 girls lived in separate sections of the dormitory that year. Joseph D'Amato was still chief dormitory supervision in 1973–1974.

The dormitory was demolished (including px-area next) in 2013 to make room for a new school (Elementary school and Kindergarten branch of European School Munich).

== Principals ==
- Rex L. Gleason, 1947 to 1968
- Richard Bauer, 1968 to 1973
- George D. Stevens, 19xx to 1976
- Joe Bressler, 1976 to 1981
- Tom Rowley, 1981 to 1986 (?)
- Anton "Tony" Lovretta, Prior to 1983 until after 1986.

George Stevens was principal of MAHS and other European schools for 17 years. He was principal at Nuremberg, Baumholder, Asmara, Wheelus, Naples, Mannheim, İzmir and Munich. He was principal for six years at Nuremberg.

== Sports ==
MAHS played against other DoDDS schools in:

- Football
- Track and Field
- Soccer
- Basketball
- Cross Country
- Wrestling
- Volleyball
- Tennis
- Skiing
- Gymnastics

Munich football played against high schools located in Frankfurt, Heidelberg, Wiesbaden, Kaiserslautern, Stuttgart, Vicenza, Augsburg, Ulm, Karlsruhe, Wurzburg, Stuttgart, Hanau, Vilseck, Ansbach, Baumholder. The football field was located to the north and west of McGraw Kaserne. The field is now owned by and is the training center for the soccer club FC Bayern Muenchen.

MAHS freshman Michael Ondruska won the boys tennis title defeating Berlin's Mat McQueen in 46 minutes, 6–1,6-1 in the Central European prep. Ondruska was the tournaments MVP.

Stephen Curtis, now at George Mason University, coached MAHS and German junior tennis teams to eight conference titles.

== Yearbook ==
The first yearbook was published in 1948 and had the title "Bayern". Subsequently, the yearbooks (from 1949 to 1959) were known as “Erinnerungen” which is translated from German into English as “Memories.” The early yearbooks included other high schools in Germany. In 1960, the MAHS yearbook cover was changed to the “Mnemonic.”

== Notable alumni ==
- Dr. Kendall L. Baker, President of the Ohio Northern University
- Ryan O'Neal, actor
- Maile Flanagan, actress
- Matmos, M. C. (Martin) Schmidt, Experimental Electronic Musician
- Michael J. Varhola, author, publisher, and lecturer
- Scott Hall, professional wrestler
- Gedeon Burkhard, actor
- Erica Lindsay, jazz musician, composer, educator, entrepreneur
