= Mitch Bainwol =

American lobbyist

Mitchell Burt Bainwol (born March 2, 1959) is an American lobbyist. He served as Chief Government Relations Officer of Ford Motor Company from 2019 to 2021 and president and CEO of the Alliance of Automobile Manufacturers from 2011 to 2019. Before the Alliance, Bainwol was chairman and CEO of the Recording Industry Association of America (RIAA) from 2003 (when he succeeded Hilary Rosen) until 2011. Prior to filling that position, he worked for 25 years in politics and federal policy-making.

== Early life and education ==
Bainwol was born in 1959 in Munich, Germany. He spent his childhood in Germany, Thailand, the Panama Canal Zone, and Maryland, before graduating from Frankfurt American High School. Bainwol studied as an undergraduate at Georgetown University and earned a Master of Business Administration degree from Rice University.

== Career ==
After his studies, Bainwol became a staff member for various Republican political figures and organizations from 1977 until 2003 (Robin Beard, Connie Mack, Bill Frist, the RNC, and the NRSC). More specifically, he served as a Congressional intern to Robin Beard, a Presidential Management Fellow (formerly PMI) at the U.S. Office of Management and Budget, chief of staff to Senator Connie Mack, a Senate Leadership Staff Director, chief of staff of the Republican National Committee, a consultant for Clark and Weinstock, executive director of the National Republican Senatorial Committee, and chief of staff to Senate Majority Leader Bill Frist. In 2003 he joined the RIAA as its CEO, succeeding Hilary Rosen. He was formerly a board member of the National Fatherhood Initiative, the Leadership Music Foundation and the Bryce Harlow Foundation.
