= BAH domain =

BAH
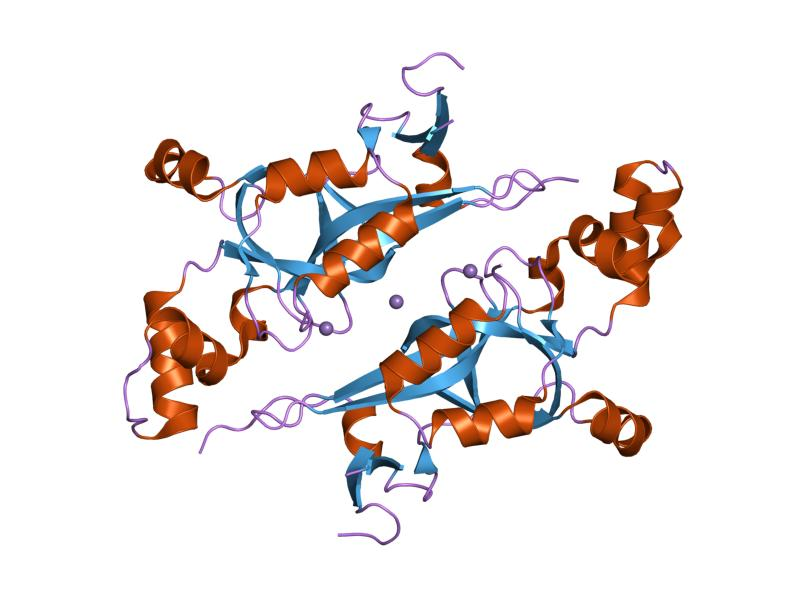
- crystal structure of the n-terminal bah domain of orc1p

Identifiers
- Symbol: BAH
- Pfam: PF01426
- InterPro: IPR001025
- MEROPS: C89
- SCOP2: 1m4z / SCOPe / SUPFAM
- CDD: cd04370
Available protein structures:
- Pfam: structures / ECOD
- PDB: RCSB PDB; PDBe; PDBj
- PDBsum: structure summary

In molecular biology, the BAH domain (bromo-adjacent homology) domain is found in proteins such as eukaryotic DNA (cytosine-5) methyltransferases, the origin recognition complex 1 (Orc1) proteins, Bromo adjacent homology domain containing 1 (BAHD1), as well as several proteins involved in transcriptional regulation. The BAH domain appears to act as a protein-protein interaction module specialised in gene silencing, as suggested for example by its interaction within yeast Orc1p with the silent information regulator Sir1p. The BAH domain might therefore play an important role by linking DNA methylation, replication and transcriptional regulation.
