= Department of Defense Dependents Schools =

Network of schools for dependents of US military personnel around the globe

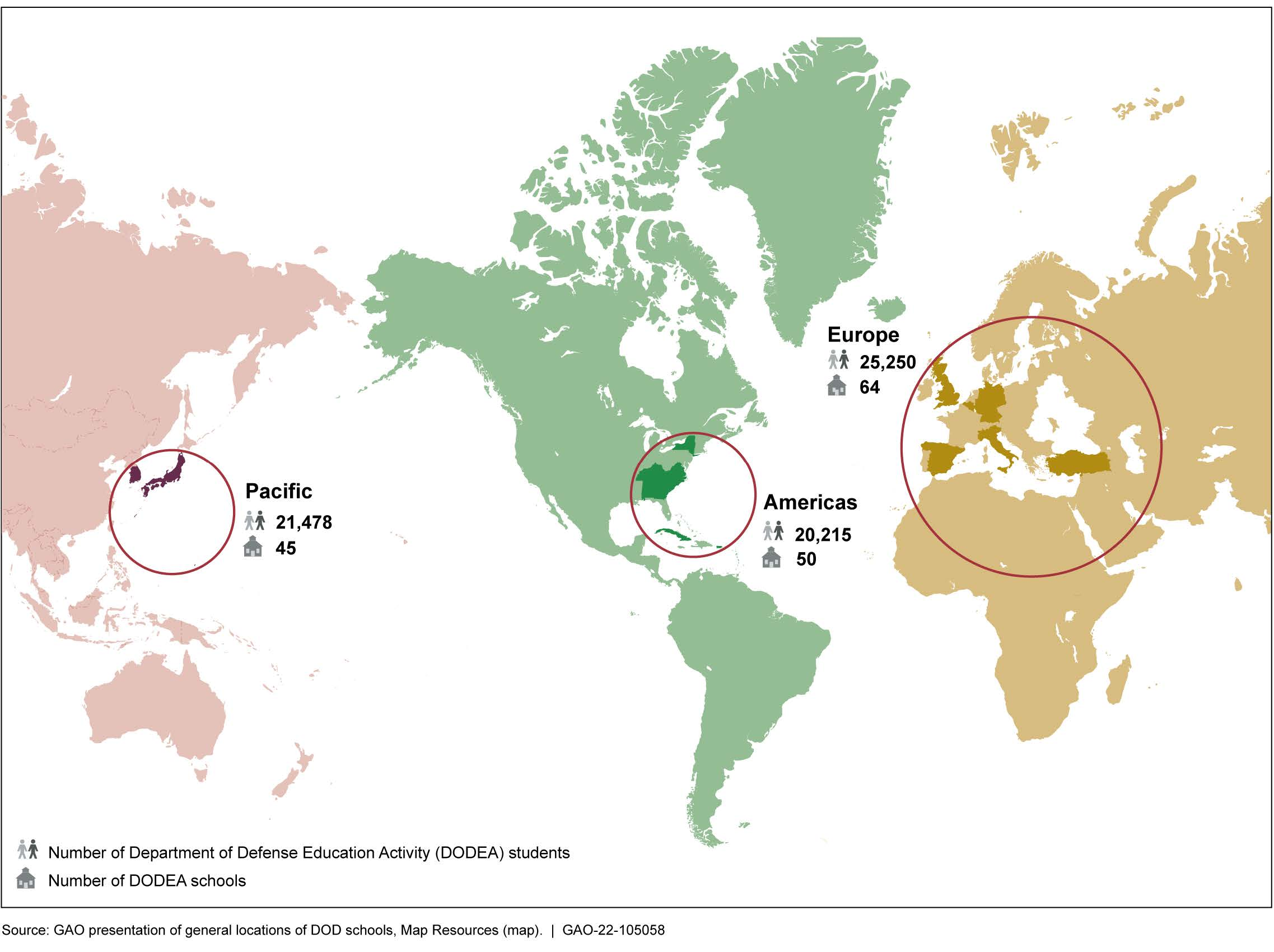
DoD schools and enrollment by region as of 2021

The Department of Defense Dependents Schools (DoDDS) are a network of schools, both primary and secondary, that serve the dependents of United States military and civilian United States Department of Defense (DoD) personnel in three areas of the world; Europe, Pacific, and Eastern United States and Caribbean areas. United States Contractor personnel supporting the Department of Defense overseas are eligible to send their dependents for a fee. The schools themselves are operated by the Department of Defense Education Activity (DoDEA).

== History ==
After World War II, the increased demand for American education overseas was a result of the government's decision to allow soldiers to bring their families when deployed. DoDDS started operating 38 elementary schools and five high schools in 1946, for the children of military overseas. The intent was to ensure an American educational experience for the American student. By 1949, almost 100 schools were being operated separately by the Army, Navy, and Air Force in countries around the world.

It then cost $10 to enroll a child ($165 in 2025 dollars). The schools would get operational funds from profits made by Class VI stores (alcohol) It now can cost as much as $20,000 for enrollment for non-Command Sponsored military families, or Command Sponsored Contractors, and increases approximately $800 annually.

In 2011 there were 120 schools. With the closing of Heidelberg High School in 2012, all of the original high schools opened in post World War II Europe are now closed, although many other DoDDS high schools have opened since then. The original six were Berlin, Bremen, Frankfurt, Heidelberg, Munich and Nurnberg. All six American High Schools opened in Germany in September/October 1946. DoDDS also operates Kubasaki High School on Okinawa, Japan, Nile C. Kinnick High School in Yokosuka, Japan (formerly Yokohama High School), and W.T. Sampson High School in Cuba.

Although operating outside the US, by 1960, the DoDDS system was the tenth largest of American school systems.

== Operations ==
All schools in the DoDDS system operate outside of the states of the United States and the District of Columbia. There are also some schools that operate on military installations within the United States, but those are grouped in a separate organization within DoDEA, the Department of Defense Domestic Dependent Elementary and Secondary Schools (DDESS). DoDDS has superintendents for two districts: Europe and Pacific. The DoDDS Pacific schools are, for the most part, in the Far East on installations in South Korea and Japan. Schools on military bases in Guam are under DDESS jurisdiction, but are administered by DoDDS Pacific (presumably for administrative convenience). Turkish DoDDS schools are served by the European branch. Schools on the Guantanamo Bay Naval Base in Cuba fall under the jurisdiction of DoDDS, but are administered by DDESS. Schools on bases in Puerto Rico are under DDESS.

Although the schools are primarily for dependents of military personnel, U.S. government employees are allowed to enrol their children in the schools on a space-available basis. As all of these schools are situated overseas, a concerted effort is made to immerse the children in the local culture. Language and culture courses are offered as early as elementary school, while advanced language courses and opportunities to intimately view the culture of the student's host nation are offered throughout high school.

DoDDS schools operate with two structures in terms of grade levels:

- The old American standard, in which elementary schools run from kindergarten to sixth grade while high school serves seventh through twelfth graders.
- A newer standard, adopted by some DoDDS facilities in the 1970s, in which kindergarten to 3rd-5th grade students attend elementary school, post-elementary students up to 8th grade attend middle school, and 9th through 12th graders attend high school.

As a result of IDEA 2004, students with special education disabilities attend schools within DoDDS. These students are in pre-K (preschool or early childhood) through high school. The infants-toddlers special education program exists overseas on U.S. military bases, though not coordinated through DoDDS. School psychologists are directly employed by DoDDS and civilian employed clinical child psychologists are employed by the U.S. military to provide direct and indirect services to students with special needs. Not all levels of special education services are available at all schools and base locations.

DoDDS range from kindergarten to 12th grade, and some universities are accredited by the Department of Defense.

In addition to operating retail facilities on overseas military installations, the Army & Air Force Exchange Service provides four million school lunches each year in overseas Department of Defense schools at a break-even expense to support military families.

== Environmental changes ==
A study was done focusing on parental absences during the time of the military deployments to Iraq and Afghanistan between 2002 and 2005. The study reports the adverse effects of deployment especially with long deployments or deployments that occur during the month of academic testing. Effects can continue and can be detrimental for children's academic achievements.

== Districts ==
For the European branch of DoDDS, there are three districts:

- Europe East – headquartered at Kaiserslautern – 35 schools across Germany
- Europe West – headquartered at Brussels – 20 schools in the United Kingdom, Belgium, Germany and the Netherlands
- Europe South – headquartered at Vicenza – 21 schools in Bahrain, Italy, Spain, and Turkey

The Pacific branch, officially DoDDS-Pacific/DDESS-Guam, has three DoDDS districts and one DDESS district:

- Pacific West District – headquartered in Seoul – 10 schools
- Pacific East District – headquartered at Yokota Air Base in Japan – 21 schools
- Pacific South District – headquartered at Kadena Air Base in Japan – 17 schools

== Miscellaneous ==
The Kaiserslautern District has the most DoDDS schools worldwide, and serves over 5,000 students.

Beginning with the 2007–08 school year, Kaiserslautern High School merged with a neighboring elementary school. Students from Landstuhl Middle School and other students living in select areas were redistricted to Kaiserslautern starting with the 2008–09 school year. Current elementary students will attend Vogelweh Elementary. Therefore, KHS's student population will increase from 650 students to about 900.

For every sports season, the schools compete in the DoDDS Championship, held at various locations.

The American Overseas Schools Historical Society, a nonprofit located in Kansas, aims to collect and preserve memorabilia and materials related to DoDDS experiences and other types of American overseas educational experiences.

== See also ==
- Military brat (U.S. subculture)
- Bavaria District (DoDDS-Europe)
- Department of Defense Education Activity
- List of schools in United States territories
