= List of schools in Italy =

This is a list of schools in Italy, listed by region.

== Abruzzo ==
- Canadian College Italy

== Campania ==
- Liceo Sannazaro
- Naples American High School

== Emilia-Romagna ==
- ITC Luigi Paolini

== Friuli-Venezia Giulia ==
- Aviano Middle/High School
- Liceo Classico Jacopo Stellini
- United World College of the Adriatic

== Lazio ==
- American Overseas School of Rome
- Ennio Quirino Visconti Liceo Ginnasio
- Lycée français Chateaubriand (Rome)
- Marymount International School of Rome
- Massimiliano Massimo Institute
- Rome International School
- St. George's British International School
- St. Stephen's International School
- Scuola Giapponese di Roma

== Liguria ==
- Deledda International School

== Lombardy ==
- American School of Milan
- Collegio Rotondi, Gorla Minore
- European School, Varese
- German School of Milan
- International School of Milan
- Liceo Daniele Crespi, Busto Arsizio
- Scuola Giapponese di Milano
- Scuola Militare Teulié

== Piedmont ==
- Liceo classico Cavour
- Liceo Classico Massimo d'Azeglio

== Tuscany ==
- Cicognini National Boarding School
- International School of Florence
- Istituto Statale della Ss. Annunziata

== Veneto ==
- The English International School of Padua
- Istituto Maffei
- Liceo Scientifico Statale "Angelo Messedaglia"
- Scuole Alle Stimate
- Vicenza American High School

== See also ==
- Education in Italy
- List of universities in Italy
- List of architecture schools in Italy
- List of academies of fine art in Italy
- Open access in Italy
