= DODDS European Championships =

DODDS European Championships are a series of sports competitions taking place in Europe and are organized by the DODDS (Department of Defense Dependents Schools) system. The term "Europeans" is a nickname that collectively refers to the three seasonal championships (autumn, winter and spring respectively) that take place every school year. Both DODDS and other international schools around Europe are invited to compete.

== History ==
DODDS opened its first school on October 14, 1946. It is designed for military children who live overseas on military bases. There are 81 schools in the DODDS system in 9 different countries overseas. The majority of the schools are in Europe. Europeans bring together hundreds of students from these schools all over Europe. Typically, they meet at a main base in Germany such as: Ramstein, Wiesbaden, Baumholder, or Kaiserslautern.

The women's volleyball teams in Italy are new to Europeans. Before it became part of Europeans it had its own league formerly known as the ISL championships (Italy School Leagues). As of 2005 it was decided that the women's volleyball teams would also compete against the teams in Germany also. Men's volleyball is still in its own ISL league due to the lack of men volleyball teams in Germany. Italy is one of the only countries that DODDS schooling has men volleyball.

== Sports ==
Fall Season

- Men's and Women's Volleyball
- Football
- Cross Country
- Tennis
- Cheerleading

Men's and Women's Golf

Winter Season

- Men's and Women's Basketball
- Cheerleading
- Wrestling

Spring Season

- Men's and Women's Track and Field
- Men's and Women's Soccer
- Women's Softball
- Men's baseball

Swimming is the only sport that is practiced and competed all year round. It has not yet been officially deemed as part of the DODDS European Competition.

== Divisions ==
Division 1:

- Lakenheath High School
- Ramstein High School
- Kaiserslautern High School
- Wiesbaden High School
- Stuttgart High School (Germany)
- Vilseck High School
- Vicenza American High School
- Naples American High School
- SHAPE High School

Division 2:

- American Overseas School of Rome [AOSR]
- International School of Brussels
- AFNORTH International School
- Bitburg Middle-High School
- Baumholder Middle-High School
- Aviano American High School
- Rota (David Glasgow Farragut High School)
- Black Forest Academy
- Bahrain School
- Marymount International School of Rome
- International School of Florence

Division 3

- Alconbury High School
- Sigonella Middle-High School
- Brussels American School
- Incirlik American High School
- Hohenfels Middle-High School
