= American School of Milan =

Coordinates: 45°28′17.73″N 9°6′42.2″E

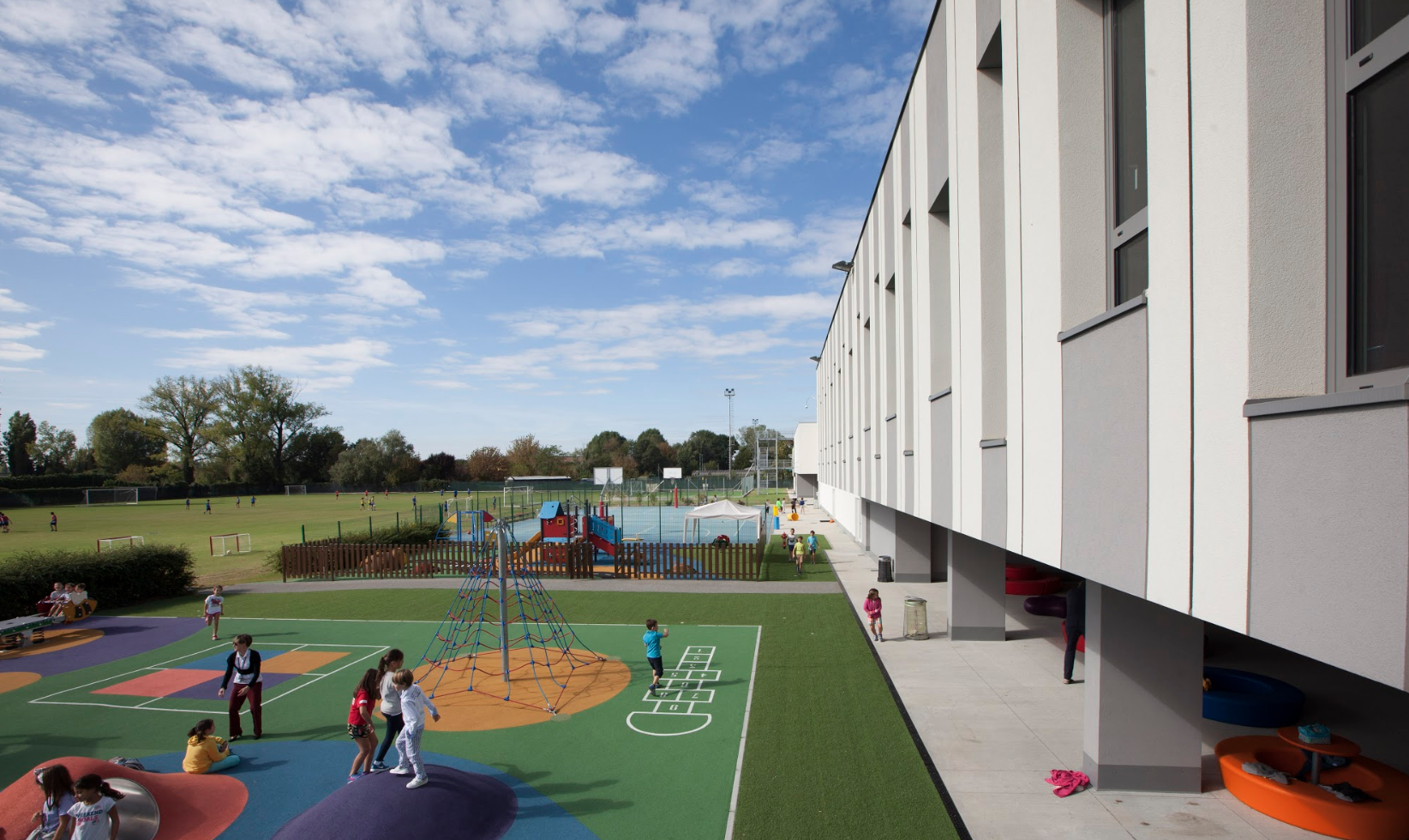
- School playground
- Via Karl Marx, 14, 20073 Noverasco MI, Italy; Italy

Information
- Type: International School
- Motto: Aim. Succeed. Become More.
- Established: 1962
- Head of school: Mr. Wayne Rutherford
- Faculty: 107
- Grades: EC - 12
- Enrollment: 840
- Mascot: Panthers
- Affiliation: Non-profit
- Website: http://www.asmilan.org

The American School of Milan (ASM) is a not-for-profit international college preparatory day school located south of Milan, Italy. ASM is accredited through the Middle States Association of Colleges and Schools and is an IB World School offering the Diploma Program since 1983. The school has held technology as a key focus for many years, integrating iPads throughout elementary school to prepare students for the 1:1 laptop program that begins in Grade 6. The school also offers 3D design, robotics, digital art, photography and film courses in a modern film studio.

The school offers instruction in English from Early Childhood through High School and the student body is composed of around 800 children aged 3–18, with 60% of the student population consisting of international students.

== Campus History ==
In 1962, 17 students of English speaking parents in Milan decided that they wanted to provide their children with an Anglo-American education. They formed a not-for-profit association dedicated to providing an American-style education for their children, hence, American Community School of Milan was launched. The association was financed through the School's small but growing community. In the early years, ASM had many different homes in Milan but in 1976, the building committee reached an agreement with a local real estate developer who donated a 9-acre property to the school in Noverasco di Opera, just south of Milan. The school was built on this site where it still stands today. It is flanked by a golf course and there is a community tennis center and pool across the street. The school has had several expansions and renovations since its establishment, the most recent was in 2019 when the school inaugurated a 500-seat auditorium.

== Affiliations and accreditations ==
ASM offers an American-international curriculum to its students with a mix of programs that combine American programs and standards with international ones. ASM has been an International Baccalaureate (IB) World School since June 1983. It offers the Diploma Programme (DP) in grades 11-12. ASM is also accredited by the Middle States Association of Colleges and Schools.

== School governance and board of trustees ==
ASM is an association under Italian law and is a non-for-profit organization run by a board of trustees elected by the parent community. The ASM board of trustees is composed of twelve volunteering members. The board appoints the director to carry out the school's day-to-day operations.

== School system ==
ASM is divided into different scholastic areas: the Early Childhood, Elementary and Upper School.

- Early Childhood (ages 3–4), a full day pre-school program where children learn through play and exploration.
- Elementary (grade Kindergarten-5): American International Program with specials that include science lab, art, music, gym, library and Italian lessons.
- Middle School (grades 6-8): ASM designed program aligned to US common core standards, mixing required and elective classes.
- High School (grades 9-12). The High School program is composed of a Diploma Preparation Program for grades 9-10 (to prepare students for the IB Diploma programme). The program offers a mix of core subjects and elective courses in the arts, technology and other academic areas; Grades 11-12 follow the IB Diploma programme and students also finish with an American High School Diploma.

== Technology ==
All classrooms are equipped with interactive whiteboards and there is Wi-Fi throughout the school. In the Elementary school, students use iPads as part of their school day, while from Grade 6 and up, students use personal laptops.

== After-School Activities ==
ASM offers a variety of after-school activities. Active or sport activities include swimming, tennis, golf, gymnastics, rock climbing, karate, taekwondo, soccer, and middle school and varsity sports (basketball, athletics, soccer, volleyball, golf, badminton, tennis). Creative options include yearbook, the elementary and upper school musicals, violin and band/orchestra, while academic options include chess, Model United Nations (MUN), technology, SAT Math & English Prep and Italian Math Prep for Italian Terza Media Exam.

== Volunteering ==
After the 2016 earthquake in Central Italy, ASM organized a fundraising event to help the victims of the Amatrice earthquake. In June 2016 and 2017, a group of students went to Nuwakot District in Nepal to help rebuild a school that was destroyed by the Gorkha earthquake in 2015. Most recently in June 2018, students traveled to Puerto Rico to help communities rebuild following Hurricane Maria.

== PTO ==
The PTO is the Parent Teacher Organization and its purpose is to enhance the students' academic, cultural, physical and social development as well as foster a sense of community for all ASM families and staff members. The PTO organizes many events during the school year including a Halloween party, International Night and Back-to-School Picnic.

== See also ==
- La Scuola d'Italia Guglielmo Marconi - Italian international school in New York City
- American Overseas School of Rome
- Aviano American High School
- Marymount International School of Rome
- Naples American High School
