= Wiesbaden High School =

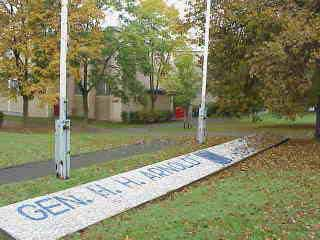

Location
- Wiesbaden, Hesse; Germany; 50°04′30″N 8°16′02″E

Information
- Type: DoDEA Secondary
- CEEB code: 576360
- Principal: Heather Ramaglia, Ph.D.
- Grades: 9–12
- Colors: Royal blue and gold
- Mascot: Warrior
- Website: www.dodea.edu/wiesbadenhs/index.cfm

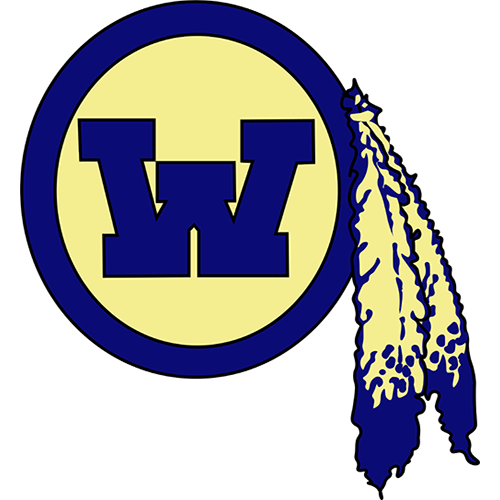
Official Emblem of the Wiesbaden Warriors

Wiesbaden High School (formerly General H. H. Arnold High School) is an American high school located in Wiesbaden, Germany, and is a part of the Department of Defense Education Activity (DoDEA), the 9th largest United States School System. Although located in Germany, the school follows a traditional U.S. curriculum and traditional U.S. school activities.

== History ==
=== 1940s ===
Wiesbaden High School was established in 1948 using a former German school building on Lahnstrasse. Prior to its opening, American high school students in Wiesbaden attended high school in Frankfurt. The initial school population was 56 students and nine faculty members. In 1949–50, the school was named General H.H. Arnold High School after Henry H. Arnold, General of the Army and General of the Air Force during and immediately after World War II. The Berlin Blockade (Berlin Airlift) which started in Wiesbaden coincided with the opening of the school, with many of the students’ parents involved.

=== 1950s ===
In January 1955, the school moved from Lahnstrasse to its present location on Texasstraße just outside the Wiesbaden city limits. Students from outlying communities lived in dormitories during the school week. Later, students from Rhein Main Air Base and the Darmstadt Military community were bused to the school until the closure of these military facilities.

=== 1960s / 1970s ===
By the 1970s the school population was up to 1800 students, recording its peak (1,809) the '72-'73 school year.

=== 1980s / 1990s ===
At the end of the 1980s the school's population was over 850 and nearly all students were either Air Force or Army dependents, few others were children of DoD civilians or expatriates. After the fall of the Berlin Wall on November 9, 1989, and subsequent collapse of the Iron Curtain and Soviet Union, the Cold War effectively ended December 25, 1991. The student body began to decline rapidly as U.S. forces drew down their presence in Europe. By 1993, the student population dropped below 500 with the closure of numerous regional installations, including the USAF Wiesbaden Hospital, Lindsey Air Station, Mainz Army Depot, Lee Barracks, and Camp Pieri. In 1995, following the closure of the Frankfurt American High School, Frankfurt-area students were bused to Wiesbaden, bringing enrollment to around 430 students.

=== 2000s ===
Immediately after the terrorist attacks on 9/11, the school heightened its security, erecting fencing and posting armed US soldiers on its perimeter. The campus has remained behind enhanced physical security measures ever since. The school's populace increased to 600 students by 2005. In 2006 the school was officially renamed Wiesbaden High School. Despite the change, its historical name of 57 years, Gen. H. H. Arnold High School, is still widely used by tens of thousands of alumni, former faculty and community members. The school's post-Cold War transformation also resulted in a reversal of key demographics, with Army dependents becoming the school's majority and Air Force dependents in the minority. This reality led to a change of the school's JROTC program, which transitioned from Air Force to Army in 2011. Wiesbaden's long-standing Air Force JROTC program had been one of only four in Germany, and seven in Europe.

=== 2010s ===
By 2010, a multi-phased transformation of the 55-year-old campus had already begun. Demolition began with the iconic space station-like Dependent Youth Activities (DYA) building, whose futuristic profile stood prominently next to the football field. It was a recreational facility that provided a lunchtime hangout and alternative eatery to the cafeteria. From 2011 to 2014, select buildings were eliminated and added, ushering the new gym, a specialized curriculum building, and multi-purpose building. By summer of 2017, the three-story main building was completed, making Wiesbaden High School the first 21st century-designed High School in DoDEA-Europe. The graduating class of 2018 was the first to graduate using the fully-completed facility. In 2019, the school was home to approximately 490 students, a mixture of American civilian, military, and international students.

== Extracurricular activities ==
Sports activities include Baseball, Basketball, Cross Country, Football, Golf, Soccer, Softball, Tennis, Track, Volleyball, Wrestling, and Air Rifle Team.

Other activities / programs include:

- Army JROTC (Air Force JROTC prior to 2012)
- Drama
- Technology Club
- Art Club

Europeans Placement 2004-2005:

- Football: European Champions

Europeans Placement 2006-2007:

- Tennis Men's: Doubles 6th Place

Europeans Placement 2008–2009 [Division II]:

- Cross Country Guys: Champions
- Cross Country Girls: 2nd Place
- Football: 2nd Place
- Volleyball: 3rd Place
- Girls’ Basketball: 3rd Place
- Air Force/Navy JROTC Drill Competition: European Champions
- Wrestling: Champions
- Softball: Fourth Place
- Girls’ Soccer: 3rd Place (Defeated Stuttgart High School)
- Boys’ Soccer: 3rd Place

Europeans 2009–2010 [Division I]:

- Football: First Place [Division I 2010-2011] [Division I 2013-2014]

Europeans 2010–2011 [Division I]:

- Air Force/Navy JROTC Drill Competition: European Champions

Europeans 2009–2010 [Division I]:

- Air Force/Navy JROTC Drill Competition (as Army JROTC): European Champions

== Traditions ==
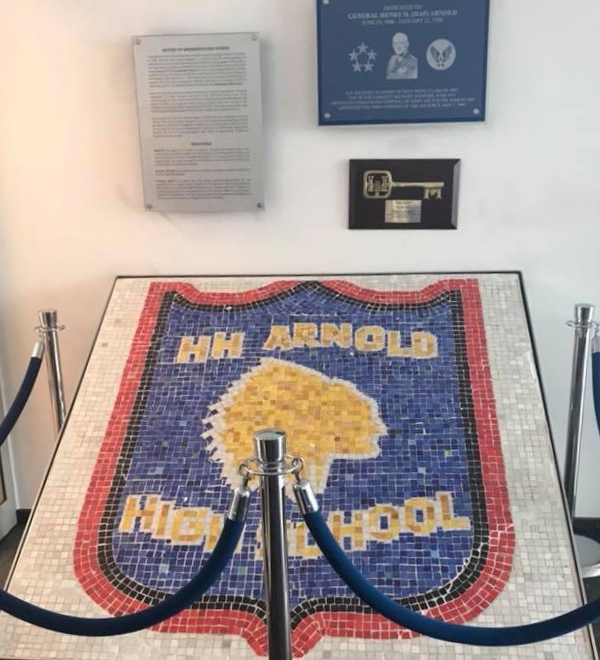
The General H. H. Arnold High School crest, an icon of the school's traditions and lore.

Protecting the school crest was a custom for nearly half a century. Although there are variants of the crest's lore, it was generally unethical for underclassmen to walk on the crest. It was the responsibility of the presiding senior class to enforce this custom. Mythology explains 'the warrior' was buried beneath the crest and if walked upon the spirit would turn over in its grave. This was considered bad luck and could be tied to misfortunes such as lost football games. During some years, it was acceptable for seniors to walk on the crest. In 2005, at the conclusion of First Lady, Laura Bush's, message to 400 assembled 'Warriors,' she remarked, "And there is one more important bit of advice I forgot to mention, and this is especially important for the lower class men: Whatever you do, don't walk on the Crest."

The crest was embedded into the floor of the main foyer in the late 1950s, and has been featured in the school's yearbooks since 1959. It comprises a mosaic-tiled blue shield with a black and red outline, featuring the school's symbolic profile of warrior with headdress and the school's former name (H H Arnold High School). The entire inlay (with border frame) is approximately 4' x 5'. The crest was carefully removed during the 2010-2017 campus transformation. The crest has been prominently displayed in the school's new facilities since 2017.

Graduating in the Kurhaus is considered an honor for diploma graduates who have enjoyed this privilege for almost as long as the school has existed.

The homecoming Bonfire was an anticipated feature of homecoming weekends, thought to recharge the spirit of the Warriors' teams. The well-attended spectacle made an impression upon author, Larry Collins, who included a description of the event in his 1989 fictional spy novel, Maze.

The school colors are royal blue and gold. They were adopted from Wiesbaden's city flag when the school was established in 1948. It has been a tradition to wear the colors on Fridays and for special events.

== Notable alumni ==
Numerous distinguished alumni have been enrolled at the school, including:

- Col. John E. Blaha ('60) -American astronaut, Commander of Space Shuttle Discovery, completed five missions in space, Astronaut Hall of Fame
- James Carroll ('60) -American author, scholar
- Deborah Bryant ('63) -Miss America 1966, former Miss Kansas
- Priscilla Presley ('63) -American actress, formerly married to Elvis Presley
- Kantathi Suphamongkhon -former Foreign Minister of Thailand
- Mayte Garcia ('91) -American dancer, actress, choreographer, singer, New York Times Bestselling author, formerly married to Prince
- Toran James ('92) -former professional American football player
- Trevor Paglen -American artist, geographer, and author

== Notable guest speakers ==
- First Lady of the United States, Laura Bush, addressed students and faculty at the school on February 22, 2005
- American Astronaut, Col. John E. Blaha, gave the commencement address at the class of 1990's graduation ceremony in the Wiesbaden Kurhaus on June 9, 1990
- American Idol's season 3 Runner-up, Diana DeGarmo sang several songs to an audience of 400 students, faculty and family members on February 22, 2005
- Commanding General of US Army Europe (USAREUR) LTG Ben Hodges, spoke at the ribbon-cutting ceremony of the newly completed 21st century school on September 13, 2017. As part of his address, he unveiled a plaque dedicated to General H. H. Arnold, the school's former namesake of more than 55 years.
- Commanding General of US Army Europe (USAREUR) LTG Donald M. Campbell Jr. was the keynote speaker for the seniors' graduation ceremony at the Wiesbaden Kurhaus on June 8, 2014.

== Film & Literature ==
- The 1988 movie, Elvis and Me, features 14-year-old Priscilla Presley on a recreated campus of General H. H. Arnold High School. In the film, Priscilla, played by actress Susan Walters, walks past the "General H. H. Arnold High School" sign as she departs school grounds. The four-hour Emmy-nominated film is an adaptation of Priscilla's autobiography of the same title.
- General H. H. Arnold High School is prominently featured in Larry Collins' 1989 fictional Cold War spy thriller, Maze. Several pages detail student interactions and traditional events at the school. The novel describes the school's annual homecoming bonfire, on a Friday night before the football team plays rival Frankfurt High School. Warrior cheerleaders lead the spirited event for a crowd of nearly 2,000 spectators. The school's most significant moment in the story is when a car bomb is detonated in the school's parking lot, leveling half of the gym. The terrorist attack at the school puts the nation on edge, adding fuel to the existing tensions between Washington and Moscow. The school is referred to 13 times by the names: General H. H. Arnold High School, General Arnold High School, Arnold High School, (the) armed forces high school, (the) high school, and (the) military school. There are four mentions of the school's mascot, applying the descriptors Warrior or Warriors.
- In Mayte Garcia's New York Times Bestselling memoir, The Most Beautiful: My Life With Prince, the school is mentioned by its original name, General H. H. Arnold High School, on four occasions. Mayte shares some of her experiences at the school, including mentions of homecoming, two proms, and her sword dance performance in the '89/'90 student talent show. Her performance in the school's talent show was video taped by her father and later viewed by Prince to showcase her world-class belly dancing talents.
