= La Scuola d'Italia Guglielmo Marconi =

Italian international school in Manhattan, New York City

Coordinates: 40°47′15″N 73°57′18″W

Location
- 12 East 96th Street; New York City, New York State 10128; United States

Information
- Established: 1977
- Website: lascuoladitalia.org

La Scuola d'Italia Guglielmo Marconi is an independent Italian international school in Manhattan, New York City, serving Pre-Kindergarten through High School/Liceo. The Italian Ministry of Foreign Affairs established the school in 1977. The Italian government accredits the school, and the New York State Association of Independent Schools accredited the school in 2006. It is the sole bilingual English-Italian preK through Grade 12 day school in North America.

== Campus ==
Campuses in Manhattan

Students attend school at the 12 East 96th Street campus. Robert L. Livingston built the house, while architect Ogden Codman, Jr. designed it.

== See also ==
- Italian Americans in New York City
- American international schools in Italy:
  - American Overseas School of Rome
  - American School of Milan
  - Aviano American High School
  - Naples American High School

== Gallery ==
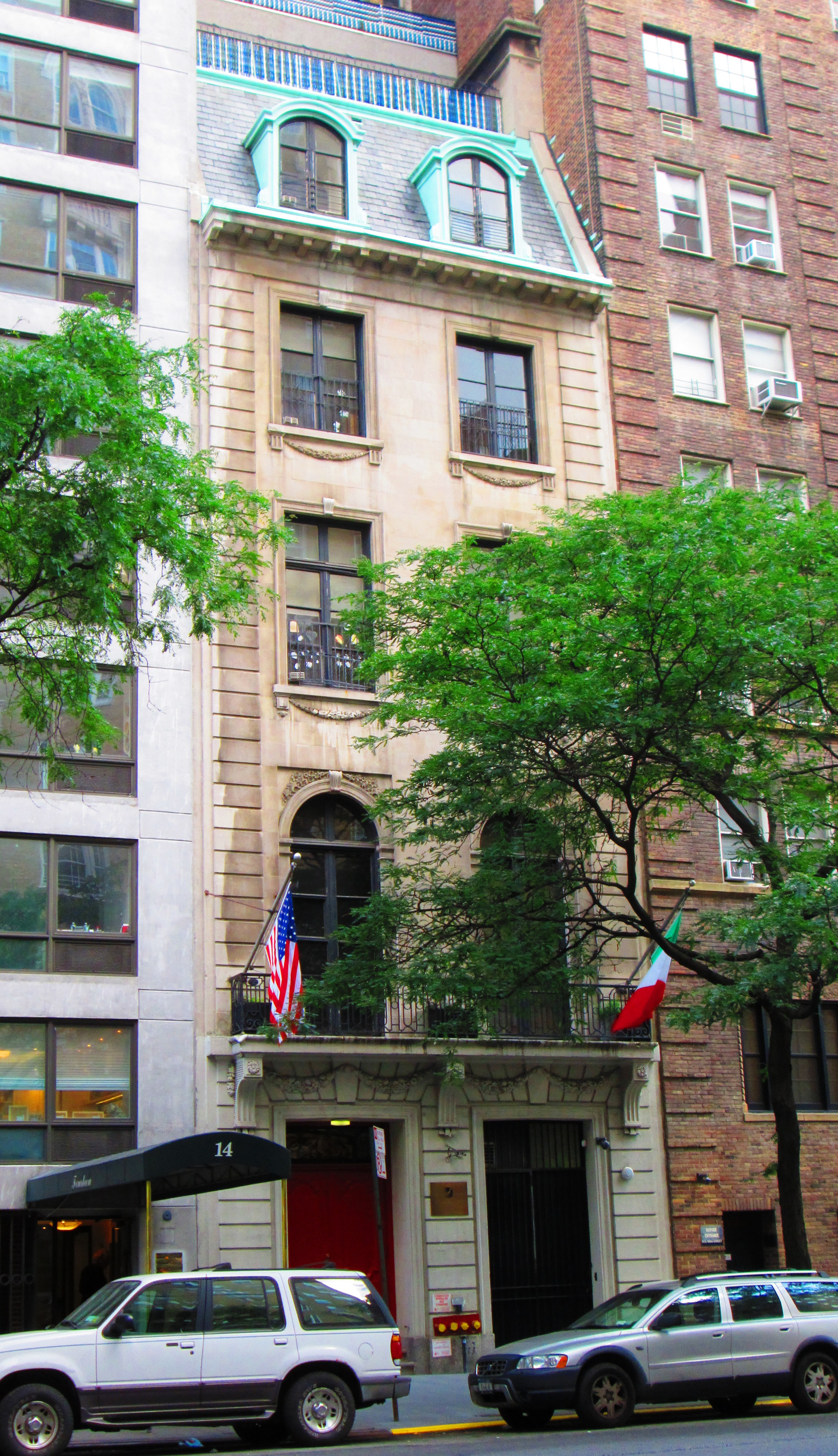
Livingston House, 12 East 96th Street

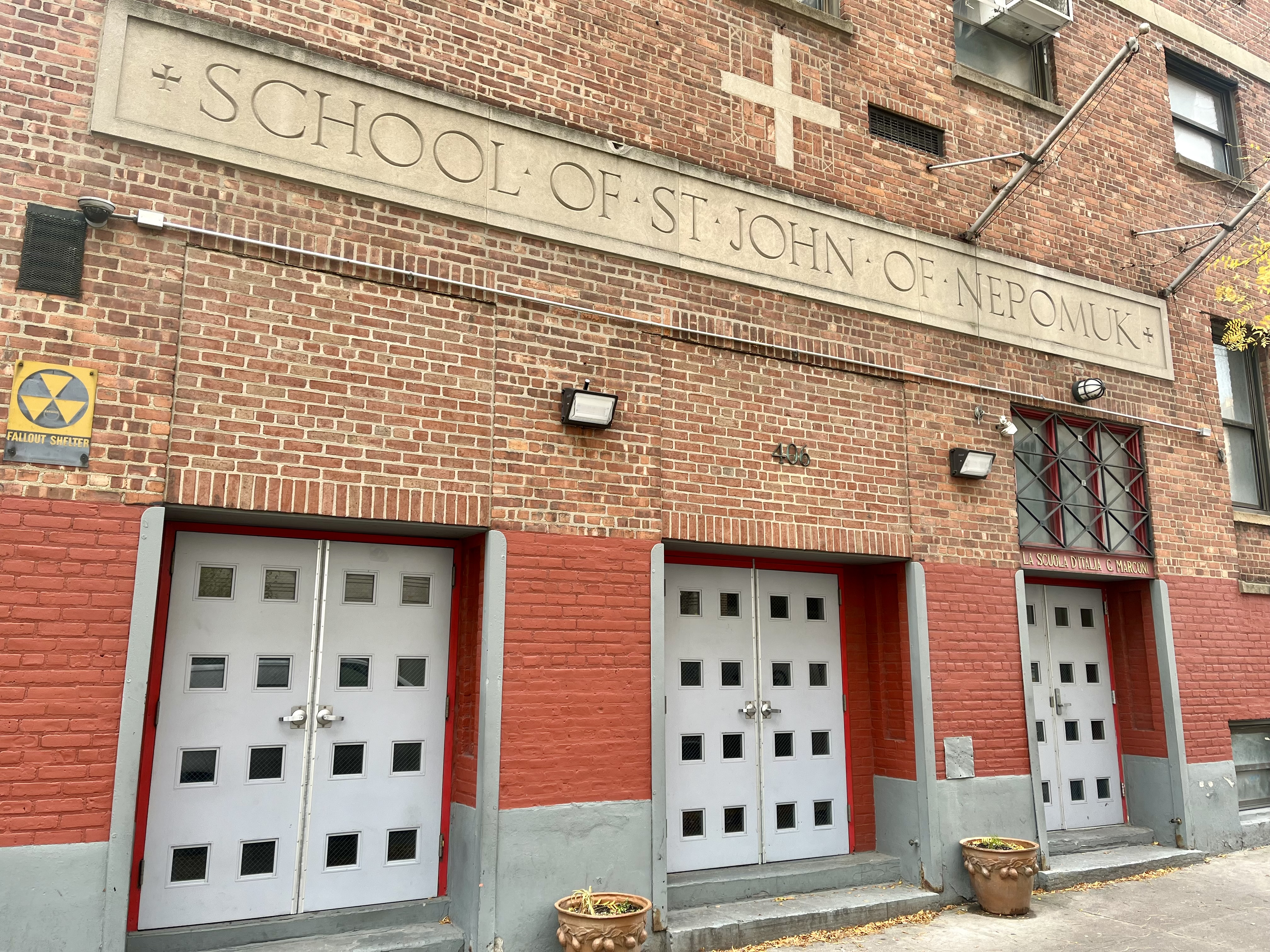
Upper School, 406 East 67th Street
