= American Overseas School of Rome =

Coordinates: 41°57′59″N 12°26′21″E

Location
- Via Cassia, 811; Rome, 00189; Italy

Information
- Type: Private School, International School
- Established: 1947
- Head of school: Dr. Kristen DiMatteo
- Faculty: 85
- Grades: Pre-K - 12
- Enrollment: 573
- Average class size: 22 students average
- Campus type: Suburban
- Colors: red, white & blue
- Mascot: Falcon
- Accreditation: Middle States Association of Colleges and Schools
- Website: www.aosr.org

The American Overseas School of Rome (AOSR) is a private international school in Rome, Italy, accredited by the United States–based Middle States Association of Colleges and Schools. It has three divisions: Elementary School, Middle School and High School. It primarily caters to the international community in Rome, Italy. Students graduating receive the American high-school diploma or the International Baccalaureate. It has been an IB World School since April 1989. The Head of the School is Dr. Kristen DiMatteo along with Mr. Jerome Duggan as the secondary school principal and Ms. Joanne Mallary as the elementary school principal.

== History ==
For the first half of its existence, the school was called the Overseas School of Rome. There was an OSR located at the Foro Mussolini (now the Foro Italico), near Ponte Milvio before 1947, but not the same school that was incorporated in that year. When news came that the Allied Forces were being moved to Trieste, five American and five British mothers (some from the original Foro Mussolini school) got together and decided to form a school which should be nondenominational and international, combining the best of the British and American systems. This group is responsible for the organization of the official corporation that became known as the American Overseas School of Rome.

The parents managed to get the British and American Ambassadors, as patrons of the school, to put pressure on the Torlonia family to rent the palazzo of Villa Torlonia on Via Nomentana as AOSR's first campus. The school opened its doors to the public on October 16, 1947, with 60 students.

In 1952, the school moved to its current location on Via Cassia. Enrollment continued to rise steadily, reflecting the increased numbers of parents assigned to embassies, consulates, and the United Nations, or living in Rome as scholars, artists, journalists, and business professionals. The Board of Trustees built a new high school building in 1956, and in 1958 an auditorium and cafeteria were completed to replace the temporary structure that had been built.

That same year, the United States government gave a grant to the school. A new elementary school was constructed, additional high school classrooms were completed, and the gymnasium was installed.

In 1965, the elementary school extension was completed, as well as leveling of the field, and the school took on its present-day appearance. The Hillside Theater was added in the early 1970s. While enrollment peaked at over 800 students in the late 1960s and early 1970s, in recent years it has stabilized at around 600 students. The change to the current name of the American Overseas School of Rome was adopted in the late 1970s.

In June 2007, AOSR celebrated its 60th anniversary on the banks of the Tiber River.

== Curriculum ==
The curriculum is that of U.S. general academic and international, college-preparatory public or private schools. The School has a strong Advanced Placement Program and also prepares students for the International Baccalaureate examinations. The School's testing program includes the College Board's PSAT, SAT/ACT, and Advanced Placement tests, as well as the full complement of IB tests. The instruction is in English. French, Spanish, and Italian are taught as foreign languages. There is no religious instruction. The School is accredited by the Middle States Association of Colleges and Schools and is the first school to be granted an International Credential from the Middle States Association.

== Elementary school ==
The curriculum of the Elementary School follows the Reggio Emilia approach. Specialists teach art, physical education, music, theater, computer, English as a Second Language, reading, and Italian. Italian students are prepared for the Quinta elementary examination as long as it is required by the Italian Ministry of Education.

== Middle school ==
AOSR Middle School focuses on the core subjects of language arts, mathematics, science, and social studies and enables students to develop skills for lifelong learning. A strong foreign language program requires students to study Italian and allows them to select French, as well. Italian students are prepared for the prima, seconda, and Terza media exams as long as they are required by the Italian Ministry of Education. All students are exposed to a variety of enrichment courses such as drama, art, computer, and music. Physical education is also an integral part of the curriculum. Student government, cultural trips, and after-school activities supplement academics in middle school.

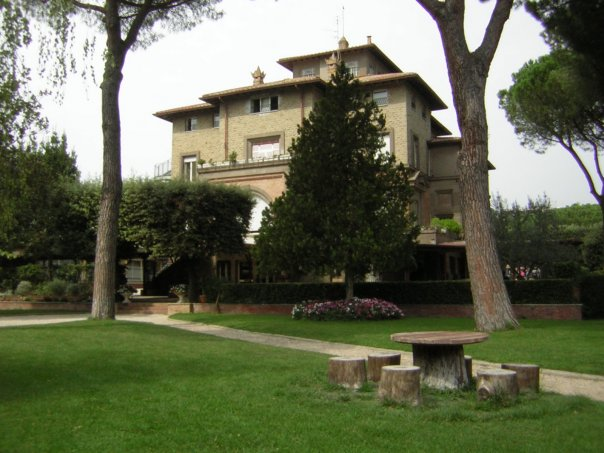
The Villa at AOSR

== High school ==
The High School is a college preparatory day offering one-year and semester courses. An 18-subject Advanced Placement Program and the International Baccalaureate Program are available, as well as a post-graduate (13th) year. Over the years, virtually all of the school's graduates have attended universities in the United States, England, Canada, Italy, France, and throughout the world.

== Athletics ==
AOSR offers a wide range of sports, including Football (Soccer), Basketball, Volleyball, Cross-country running, Tennis, Cheerleading, and Wrestling. Athletics function as an integral part of the total curriculum and life at AOSR. The school plays in the American Schools Italy League (ASIL). The ASIL is part of the DoDEA run by the US Department of Defense. The program has 4 divisions with the larger schools being in divisions 1 and 2 and the smaller ones in 3 and 4. AOSR is in division 2. Each sports season consists of a few months of competition and culminates at the European championships, usually held in Germany. Mr. Daniel Zacaroli is the Athletic Director and he oversees the school's athletic membership in the Dodds Mediterranean league besides inspiring young athletes to engage in sports. The American Overseas School of Rome athletic teams are known as the "Falcons." The school's cross-town rivals are primarily Marymount International School of Rome and St. Stephen's International School.

== Nationalities ==
The American Overseas School of Rome is home to an international student body of around 600 students with approximately one-third from the United States, one-third from Italy, and the remaining third from 50 different countries.

== Organization ==
The School is governed by a 12-member Board of Trustees, who are elected by the parents or guardians of children enrolled in the School. The School is recognized as a non-profit institution under Italian law and is incorporated in the State of Delaware as tax-exempt under Section 501(c) (3) of the US Internal Revenue Code.

== Associations and memberships ==
The American Overseas School of Rome is a member of RISA (Rome International Schools Association), CIS (Council of International Schools) and ECIS.

The American University of Rome and American Overseas School of Rome (AOSR) signed a cooperation agreement on February 7, 2008. The schools work together to seek outside funding for school projects and share facilities, special programs, and opportunities for faculty development.

== Notable alumni ==
- Blanche Baker
- Justin Davidson
- Federico De Laurentiis
- Herschel Garfein
- Bart Giamatti
- Samuel D. Gruber
- Alessandra Mussolini

== See also ==
- La Scuola d'Italia Guglielmo Marconi – Italian international school in New York City
- American School of Milan
- Aviano American High School
- Marymount International School of Rome
- Naples American High School
