= Villaggio =

Villaggio is an Italian word meaning "village". It may refer to:

== Places ==
=== Italy ===
- Villaggio Coppola, a civil parish of Castel Volturno (CE), Campania
- Villaggio Olimpico (Olympic Village), a quarter of Rome
- Pergusa (also named Villaggio Pergusa), a civil parish of Enna, Sicily
- Villaggio del Pescatore (slv: Ribiško Naselje), a civil parish of Duino-Aurisina (TS), Friuli-Venezia Giulia

=== Qatar ===
- Villaggio Mall, a shopping mall in Doha

=== United States ===
- Villaggio Italia Resort, an Italian resort in the town of Haines Falls, on the Catskill Mountains, State of New York

== People ==
- Paolo Villaggio (1932–2017), Italian actor, writer, director and comedian

== Other ==
- Il sabato del villaggio, a poetry of Giacomo Leopardi
