= Istituto tecnico tecnologico =

Italian secondary school

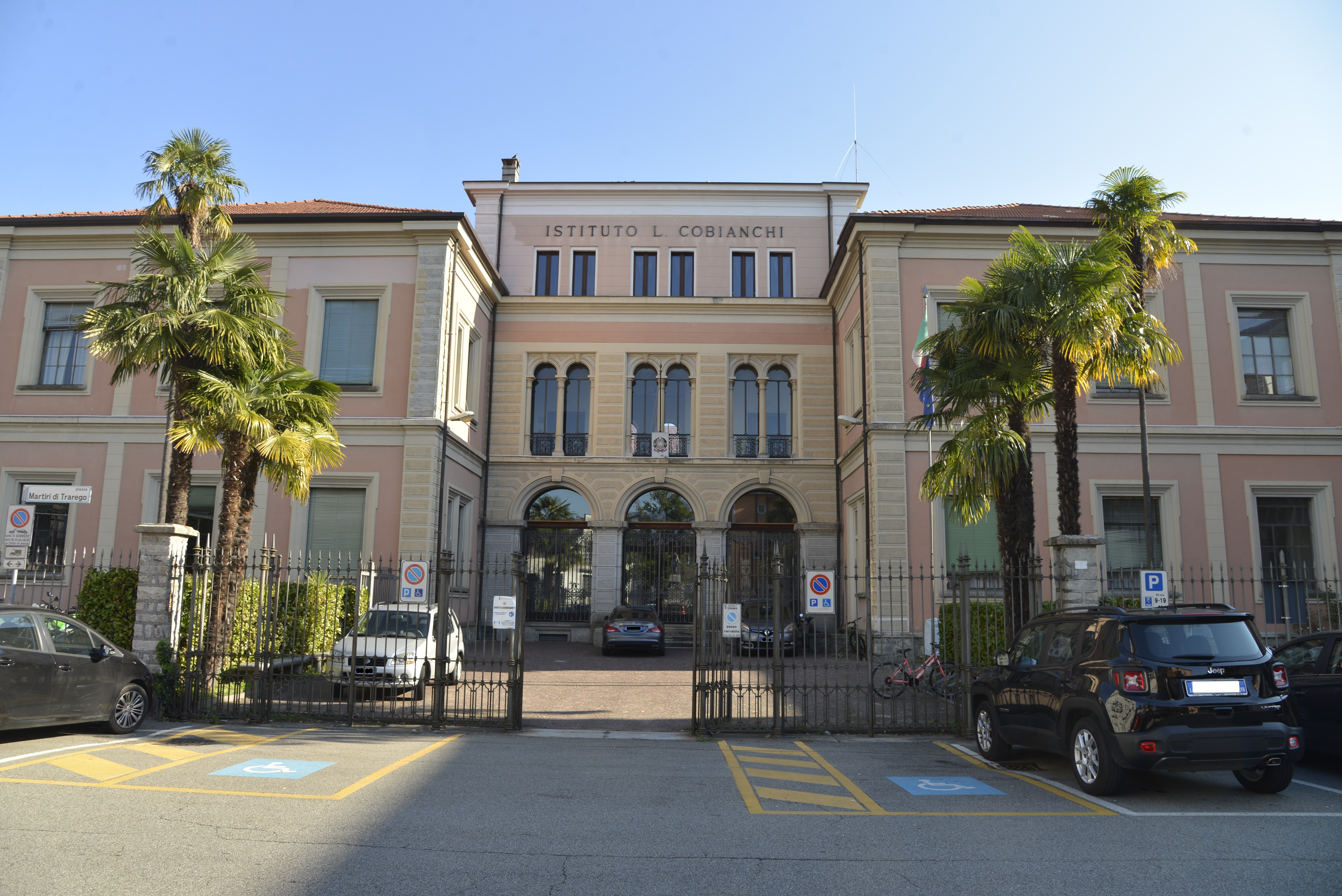
A high school in Verbania, the istituto tecnico tecnologico Lorenzo Cobianchi

Istituto tecnico tecnologico (literally "technical technological institute") is a type of secondary school in Italy specialized in technology, informatics, electronics, chemical industry, biotechnology, construction management, geotechnics and fashion.

It gives students the skills to progress to any higher educational institution. Students can attend an istituto tecnico tecnologico after successfully completing scuola media (middle school).

Students typically study for five years and attend the school from the age of 14 to 19. At the end of the fifth year all students attend the esame di Stato ("state exam"), a final examination which gives access to every university course.

A student is called "studente" (male) and "studentessa" (female) are also in common use. Teachers are known as professore (male) or professoressa (female).

The course is divided into two specialised paths:

- Meccanica, meccatronica ed energia ("mechanics, mechatronics and energy")
- Trasporti e logistica ("transport and logistics")
- Elettronica ed elettrotecnica ("electronics and electrical engineering")
- Informatica e telecomunicazioni ("IT and telecommunications")
- Grafica e comunicazioni ("graphics and communications")
- Chimica, materiali e biotecnologie ("chemistry, materials and biotechnology")
- Sistema moda ("fashion system")
- Agraria, agroalimentare e agroindustria ("agriculture, agro-food and agro-industry")
- Costruzione, ambiente e territorio ("building")

== See also ==
- Istituto tecnico economico
- List of schools in Italy
