= Istituto tecnico economico =

Italian secondary school

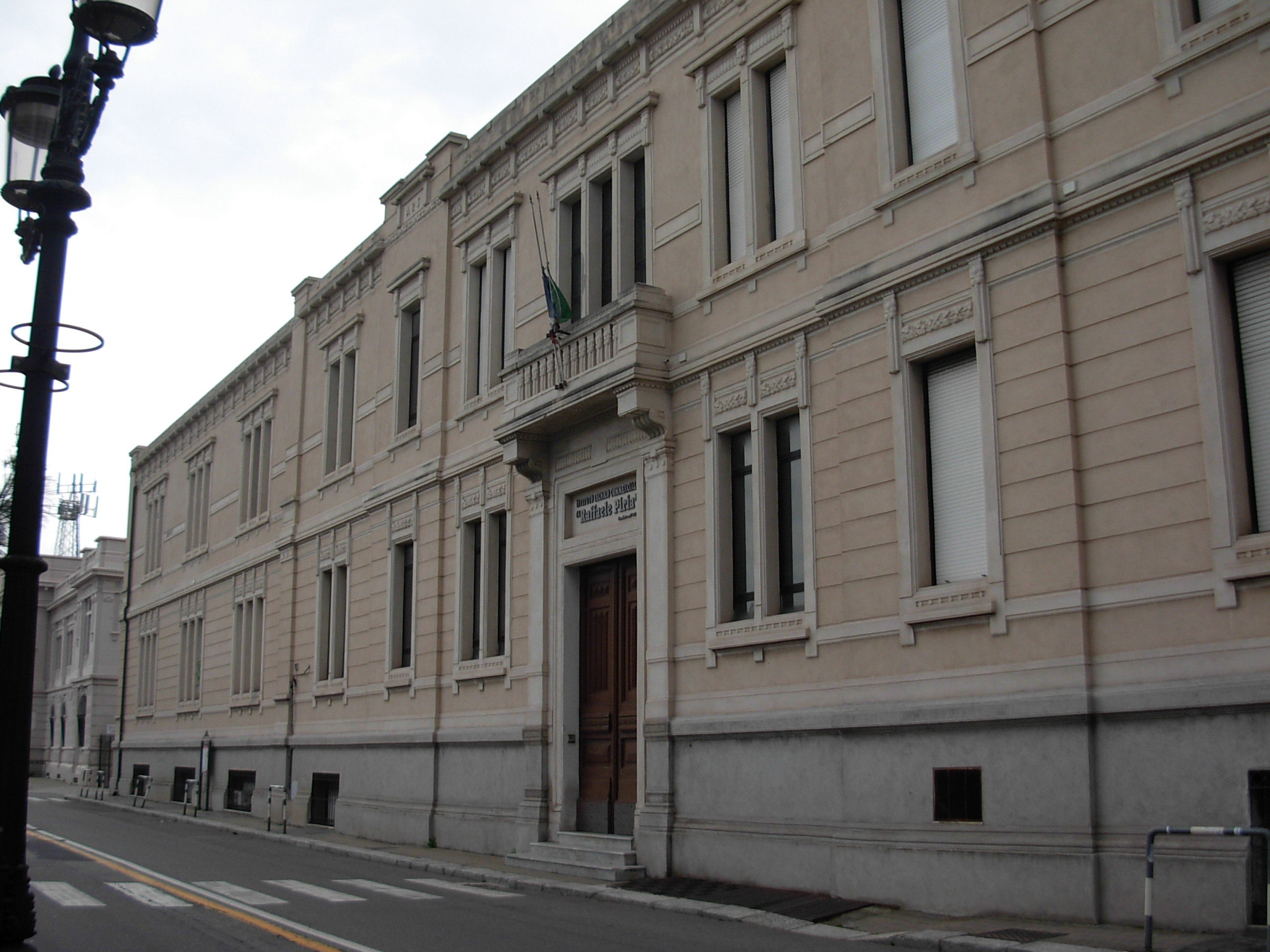
A high school in Empoli, the istituto tecnico economico Raffaele Piria

Istituto tecnico economico (literally "technical economic institute") is a type of secondary school in Italy specialized in business and economy. It gives students the skills to progress to any higher educational institution.

Students can attend an istituto tecnico economico after successfully completing scuola media (middle school).

The curriculum is devised by the Ministry of Education and emphasises the link between the economy, administration, management and the law.

The course is divided into two specialised paths:

- Amministrazione, finanza e marketing ("administration, finance and marketing") – born in 2010 from the union of three previous management oriented secondary school (called istituto tecnico commerciale, istituto tecnico per periti aziendali and istituto tecnico per le attività sociali), it specialises in economy, law, accounting, political sciences, management and marketing.
- Turismo ("tourism") – born in 2010 from a previous courses of study called istituto tecnico per il turismo, it specialises in tourism and related topics.

The education given offers both a wide theoretical education and a technical specialization in a specific field of studies (e.g.: economy, humanities, administration, law and accountancy), often integrated with a six months internship in a company, association or university, during the fifth and last year of study.

Students typically study for five years and attend the school from the age of 14 to 19. At the end of the fifth year all students attend the esame di Stato ("state exam"), a final examination which gives access to every university course.

A student is called "studente" (male) and "studentessa" (female) are also in common use. Teachers are known as professore (male) or professoressa (female).

== See also ==
- Istituto tecnico tecnologico
- List of schools in Italy
