= Bahrain School =

The Bahrain School
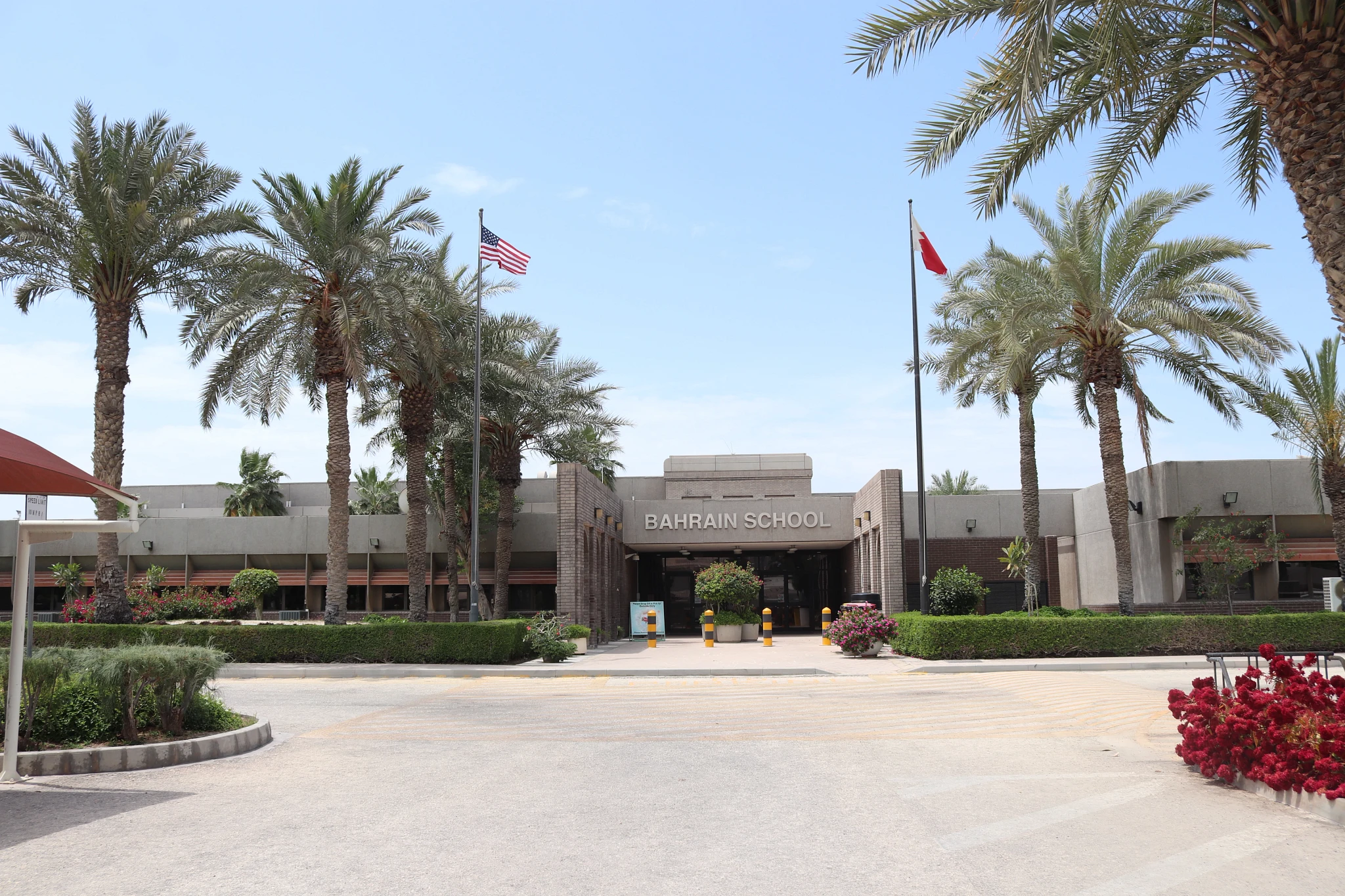
- Al Ghurafaiyah Building 540 Area 342 Road 4225; Juffair, Manama, Bahrain

Information
- Type: Private
- Established: 1967 (59 years ago)
- CEEB code: 563100
- Principal: Allison Peltz (Elementary school); Shana D. Seawright (Middle/High school)
- Colors: Purple and gold
- Mascot: Eagles (Elementary school); Falcons (Middle/High school)
- Website: bahrainmhs.dodea.edu

Bahrain School is a American Department of Defense Education Activity (DoDEA) school located in Juffair, Manama, Bahrain.

== Overview ==
The school is operated by the Bahrain International School Association (BISA) with the United States Department of Defense Education Activity (DoDEA) and takes students from Kindergarten to Twelfth grade. Graduating seniors can earn an American diploma, an AP Capstone Diploma, and from 1982 to 2023 an International Baccalaureate Diploma.

Bahrain School is the only DoDEA school in the Persian Gulf area. The closest DoDEA school to Bahrain School is George C. Marshall School in Ankara, Turkey. It provides education primarily to the children of the United States Navy stationed in Bahrain, but historically, about half of the student body has been local enrollment, usually the dependents of diplomatic personnel and ARAMCO employees, as well as wealthy Bahraini citizens. The Navy dependent population declined in July 2004 when dependents were sent home due to security concerns. In July 2009, dependents were again authorized to return to Bahrain.

As of 2026, there were around 600 total students enrolled in the elementary, middle, and high schools. 330 of those students were in the elementary school, while the other 270 was in the middle/high school. The student body made up 29 countries, with a teacher to student ratio of fifteen students to one teacher. The school employed seventy faculty. Of those, 40 were teachers, and 30 were staff.

In 2024 a rain storm damaged the school, and so it closed for three weeks. Jim Banks (R-Indiana) sponsored an addition to a bill stating that US military employees in Bahrain could instead use money from the federal government to send their children to private schools. Banks cited the rainstorm and accused the school of "struggling with poor teaching" and "[celebrating] a notorious antisemite." The addition was removed from the bill in 2024.

In June 2025, tensions between Iran and Israel caused security risks in the region, prompting dependents, including children who are enrolled to The Bahrain School, to be evacuated to a "save haven." Dependents and non-essential personnel returned to the country the following month and the school remained interrupted.

Due to the 2026 Iran war, the school closed on February 28th as evacuations were started out of Bahrain. DoD dependent students up to 8th grade had to enroll in a new school once they reaches their safe haven. Students in grades 9-12 had the option to complete the school year using the DoDEA Virtual High School (DVHS) service, or they could also enroll into a new school. Non-dependent students up to 8th grade had to enroll in a new school as virtual classes with their needs were unavailable. As of September 2026, the school campus is non operational.

== Sports ==
Bahrain School offers badminton, basketball, football, cross country, track and field, golf, badminton, volleyball, baseball, and swimming. The school often competes against other schools on the island, and occasionally competes in competitions including American and international schools in the Arab world. The school also competes in division two of the DODDS European Championships and their most recent title is the boys varsity volleyball team winning the division two boys championship in Vicenza, Italy during 2025 in a 3-0 victory over Black Forest Academy.

== Accreditation ==
Bahrain School is accredited by the North Central Association of Colleges and Schools to offer an American diploma. The College Board authorizes Bahrain School to offer Advanced Placement courses: Calculus AB, Microeconomics, Chemistry, Physics, Macroeconomics, English Language, English Literature, French, German, World History, Human Geography, U.S Government and Politics, Precalculus, 3D Art, Computer Science Principles, and Spanish. On March 1, 1982, the school became the first in the Kingdom of Bahrain and the second in the Middle East after the American International School in Amman, Jordan in 1981, to offer the International Baccalaureate Diploma under the accreditation of the International Baccalaureate Organization.

== Notable alumni ==
- Salman bin Hamad Al Khalifa, Crown Prince and Prime Minister of Bahrain
- Summer Bishil, actress
- Shakira, singer-songwriter

== See also ==
- List of schools in Bahrain
