= Castel Volturno =

- Comune
- Comune di Castel Volturno
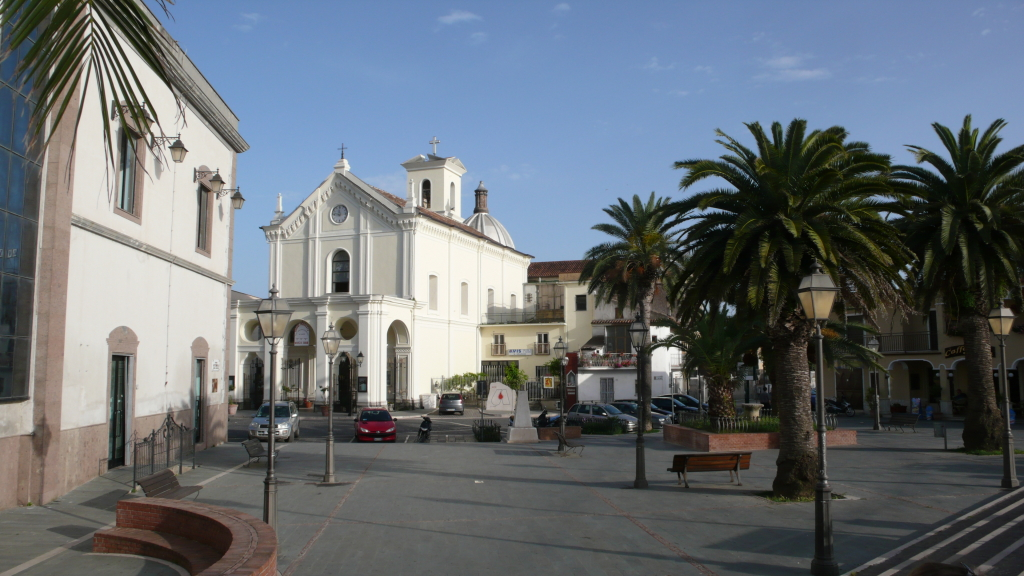

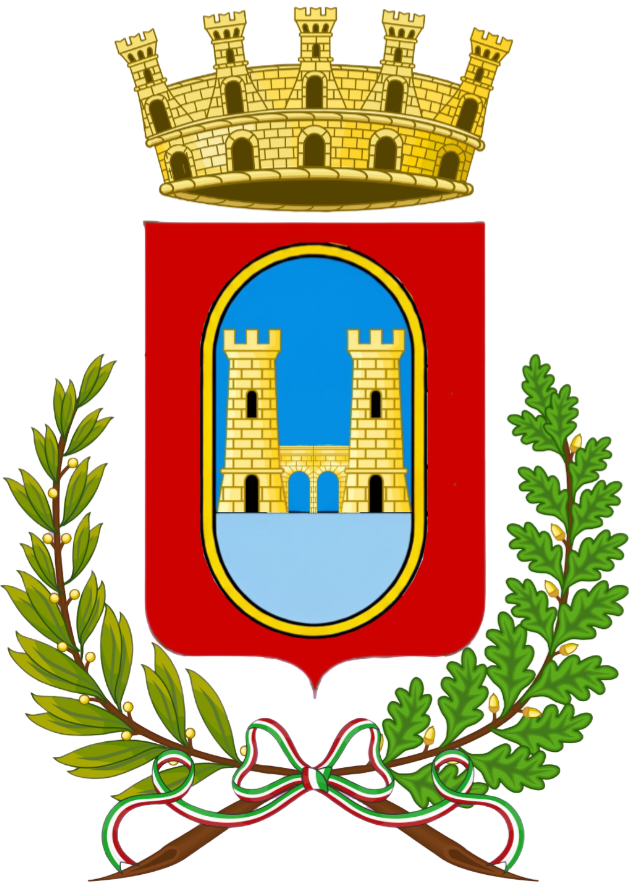
- Coat of arms

- Location within Italy Location within Campania
- Coordinates: 41°3′N 13°55′E
- Country: Italy
- Region: Campania
- Province: Caserta (CE)
- Frazioni: Bagnara, Baia Verde, Borgo Domizio, Destra Volturno, Ischitella, Scatozza, Seponi, Villaggio Coppola Pinetamare, Villaggio del Sole.

Government
  - Mayor: Dimitri Russo

Area
  - Total: 72.23 km^{2} (27.89 sq mi)

Population (30 September 2015)
  - Total: 25,292
  - Density: 350.2/km^{2} (906.9/sq mi)
- Demonym: Castellani
- Time zone: UTC+1 (CET)
  - Summer (DST): UTC+2 (CEST)
- Postal code: 81030
- Dialing code: 0823 (communal seat), 081 (Villaggio Coppola Pinetamare)
- Patron saint: San Castrese
- Saint day: February 11
- Website: Official website

Castel Volturno (Italian pronunciation: [kaˈstɛl volˈturno]) is a comune (municipality) in the Province of Caserta in the Italian region Campania, located about 35 kilometres (22 mi) northwest of Naples and about 35 kilometres (22 mi) west of Caserta on the Volturno river. The town has a population of almost 30,000 residents, along with an estimated more than 15,000 undocumented immigrants.

== History ==
Castel Volturno was a settlement of the Oscans and then of the Etruscans, who called it Volturnum, and was a trade point on the road to Casilinum and Capua. Volturnum became a Roman colony in 194 BC and, in 95 AD, it was reached by the Via Domitiana, and received a large bridge connecting the two shores of the river with the same name.

The town decayed after the fall of the Western Roman Empire, and, in 806, the Lombard Prince of Benevento Grimoald III gave its port to the abbots of Montecassino. In 841 it was ravaged by Saracens. After 856, the Lombard bishop Radipert had a castle built on what remained of the bridge. After a period under local counts, in 1062 it was again given to Montecassino while in 1206, Frederick II donated it to the archbishops of Capua.

Alfonso V of Naples gave it to his daughter, but, when her husband, Duke Marino of Sessa, rebelled, besieged it and destroyed part of the walls (1460). The following year the king sold it to the city of Capua, which held it until the abolition of feudalism in the Kingdom of the Two Sicilies in 1810. In 1812 it became an autonomous commune. In 1860 it was annexed to the newly unified Kingdom of Italy.

Castel Volturno received a boost in its agricultural activities after the nearby lands were dried during the Fascist government, and after the new Domiziana Road and a new bridge were built (1954).

The beach resorts were expanded after the Second World War into a holiday resort. Holiday guests included members of a nearby US Army base. After an earthquake in 1980 in the Campania region, the Italian government temporarily housed homeless people in the apartments. Then the homeowners left the apartments empty and later leased them to African migrant workers. Since then, the living substance of the seaside resort has decayed continuously. Because of the illegal waste disposal of the Camorra, the beach is often littered with garbage despite regular cleaning. In addition to regular garbage, toxic waste leeching from unregulated landfills in the vicinity, also from the Camorra, has contaminated the beach and forced a near complete prohibition on entering the water in places.

=== Villaggio Coppola ===
According to some reports, the Villaggio Coppola beach settlement was illegally built by the Camorra clan of Casalesi in the 1970s. However, a 2017 New York Times article on the project more sympathetically reports: "When Villaggio Coppola was built in the 1960s... the aspiration was of a utopian residential area.", and does not mention any involvement of the Camorra in its inception. While the origins of this project have not been well documented, the buildings remain in use to the present day, and can now be seen as a profound ongoing architectural statement, evolving and decaying outside of the influence of normal market forces.

The Villaggio Coppola was used as the principal setting of the 2018 film Dogman, where it serves as an eerie interstitial microcosm and earns a credit for "il Patrocinio Morale", or 'morale guidance'.

=== African immigration - human trafficking ===
According to Camorra's opponent Roberto Saviano, in the 2000s Castel Volturno is said to have been "completely handed over" to foreign clans by the Camorra, namely "clans from Lagos and Benin City" - for the purpose of cocaine trafficking and for the transit of prostitutes to the whole of Europe. Despite the dominance of the Nigerian mafia clans, ecclesiastical institutions, including the Commune of the Comboni missionaries, organize a social and moral alternative to the clans. Many crimes were prevented or clarified by members of African immigrants. Saviano considers Castel Volturno to be a city of the future as it is controlled and managed by immigrants - so anti-criminal forces should be supported.

In contrast, claimed a television reportage of Spiegel TV, citing the Italian journalist Sergio Nazarro, that the development of African crime clans on the model of the Camorra first used in Italy. According to him, the place is the epicenter of the Nigerian mafia, "since the Italian mafia increasingly invested in legal industries, where it washes their billions." In fact, according to a Spiegel report from 2019, young women from Nigeria, not last also from the parents, pushed to prostitution in Italy respectively Castel Volturno. On a woman, who then refused on the spot, an example was made. There is a climate of fear due to the Nigerian gangs around, so that many prostitutes are intimidated and would not go to the police.

=== Castel Volturno massacre ===
The Castel Volturno massacre was a massacre perpetrated by the Casalesi clan that led to the deaths of seven people on September 18, 2008. The massacre outside the Ob Ob Exotic Fashion tailor shop on the Via Domitiana was widely characterized as part of a growing conflict between the native Camorra and the immigrant African drug gangs. Murdered were Antonio Celiento, the owner of an arcade next to Baia Verde, and six African immigrants: Samuel Kwaku, 26 (Togo); Alaj Ababa (Togo); Francis Antwi, 31 (Ghana); Eric Affum Yeboah, 25 (Ghana); Alex Geemes, 28 (Liberia) and Cristopher Adams, 28 (Liberia). Joseph Ayimbora (Ghana), 34, survived by feigning death; he later helped identify the killers.

The murders sparked violent protests from Castel Volturno's immigrant community the following day, which culminated in the signing of measures launched by the Ministry of Interior and the Ministry of Defense on combating organized crime and illegal immigration to Caserta.

== Main sights ==
- Castle
- Chapel of San Castrese
- Torre di Patria, a watch tower built in the 15th century

== See also ==
- Villaggio Coppola
