= Military dependent =

Family members of military personnel

Military dependents are the spouse(s), children, and possibly other familial relationship categories of a sponsoring military member for purposes of pay as well as special benefits, privileges and rights. This generic category is enumerated in great detail for U.S. military members.

The term "military brat" is also commonly used in military culture to mean a military dependent who is either a child or a teenager. The term is not an insult but carries connotations of respect and affection. Currently the U.S. Department of Defense estimates that there are approximately 15 million individuals in the United States who are current or former military brats. It is also used in research studies. It also refers to the subculture of American military brats.

== Benefits in the United States ==
=== Service-member's death benefits ===
The Department of Veterans Affairs (VA) automatically gives $100,000 to the next of kin of a service-member if he or she dies while on active duty. If a service-member died of a disease, injury, or disability that was incurred or aggravated on duty or during training, then the surviving spouse and other dependents can apply for additional monetary benefits. If the service-member died after January 1, 1993, then his or her surviving dependents can receive a monthly Dependency and Indemnity Compensation based on the deceased service-member's rank in the United States military. The base monthly rate for a surviving spouse is $1,154 per month, with an additional $286 for each dependent child and/or elderly person.

The Department of Veteran Affairs also offers a death pension for surviving spouses and other dependents of the deceased service-member. To be eligible for the death pension, the surviving spouse cannot be remarried, and the children must be under 18 years of age unless they are in college, in which case they must be under 23 years of age. The death pension provides the surviving spouse with $7,933 annually with an additional $2,452 if he or she has one child. Each additional child or dependent receives an additional $2,020 each year. Finally, the VA also provides up to $2,000 for the deceased service-member's burial if the service-member or the service-member's family does not use a national Veteran Affairs cemetery. If a service-member is buried in a national VA cemetery, all costs and materials are covered, including a headstone and United States flag

=== Education ===
The Department of Veteran Affairs offers educational assistance to surviving spouses or child dependents. In order to receive the educational assistance, the service-member must (1) have died due to a service-related disability, (2) be missing in action for more than 90 days, or (3) be hospitalized with debilitating injuries. Surviving spouses cannot use the educational assistance if they remarry before the age of 57, and or if they do not use the assistance within 10 years of their date of eligibility. Children must use their educational assistance between the ages of 18 and 26. The VA provides $936 per month to eligible dependents if they are enrolled in a full-time educational program. Several collegiate institutions provide benefits for military dependents such as Colorado State University. An Active-Duty servicemember can transfer their Post-9/11 GI Benefits to their spouse or dependent children, the benefits may include tuition, housing, books and supplies, fees for national standardized tests and licensing and certifications. Through the Military Tuition Adjustment Request, dependents can be granted in-state tuition status which can be financially beneficial.

=== Housing ===
Spouses of veterans gain loan eligibility if:

1. They are unmarried, and their deceased spouse died as a result of service-connected causes.
2. They remarry after the age of 57, and their deceased spouse died while on active duty.
3. They are the spouse of an active duty member who has been missing in action or a prisoner of war for at least 90 days.

=== Career Development and Support Programs ===
Military spouses face unique employment challenges due to frequent relocations, leading to development of specialized support programs:

Military Spouse Career Advancement Accounts (MyCAA) provides up to $4,000 in financial assistance for eligible spouses to pursue licenses, certifications, or associate degrees in portable career fields. Eligibility is limited to spouses of active-duty service members in pay grades E-1 through E-6, W-1 through W-2, and O-1 through O-3.

Portable Career Fields have become essential for military spouse employment continuity across relocations. High-demand portable careers include:

- Healthcare: Registered Nurse, Licensed Practical Nurse, Medical Assistant, Dental Hygienist
- Education: Teacher (with reciprocal state licenses), Tutor, Early Childhood Educator
- Technology: Software Developer, Web Designer, IT Support, Cybersecurity Analyst
- Business: Accountant, Virtual Assistant, Human Resources Specialist, Project Manager

Interstate Licensure Compacts reduce barriers to employment by allowing licensed professionals to practice across multiple states without obtaining new licenses for each move:

- Nursing Licensure Compact (NLC) - 38 participating states
- Psychology Interjurisdictional Compact (PSYPACT) - 33 states
- Physical Therapy Compact - 38 states
- Occupational Therapy Compact - 36 states
- Counseling Compact - 39 states

The Military Spouse Employment Partnership (MSEP) connects spouses with over 500 partner employers who have committed to recruiting, hiring, promoting, and retaining military spouses in portable careers.

In 2023, Blue Star Families and Hiring Our Heroes, in collaboration with the Department of Defense’s MSEP, launched the '4+1 Commitment' to encourage employer policies supporting military spouse employment.

== See also ==
- Forgotten Widows
