= David Glasgow Farragut High School =

David Glasgow Farragut Middle/High School

Location
- PSC 819, Box 63; FPO AE 09645-0005; Naval Station Rota; Spain; 36°37′16″N 6°18′23″W

Information
- School type: DoDEA
- Opened: 1975
- Status: Open
- School district: DoDEA Europe South
- Principal: Courtney Schonffeldt
- Grades: 6–12
- Education system: DoDDS
- Classes offered: Regular, Honors, Advanced Placement
- Hours in school day: 7
- Colors: Blue, white, black
- Sports: Wrestling, football, soccer, and basketball
- Mascot: Admiral
- Nickname: Rota MHS
- Team name: Admirals
- Accreditation: AdvancED
- Communities served: Naval Station Rota Spain
- Affiliation: DoDDS
- Website: www.dodea.edu/RotaMHS/

David Glasgow Farragut Middle/High School is a secondary school for students in grades 6 through 12 located on Naval Station Rota Spain. DGF High School (also referred to as Rota High School) is a member of the Mediterranean District of the Department of Defense Dependent Schools (DoDDS) operated by the Department of Defense Education Activity.

== Academics ==
First opened in the Fall of 1958, David Glasgow Farragut School at Rota Naval Station, Spain, consisted of Kindergarten through grade 12. Since 1975, Rota High School (also known as David Glasgow Farragut Middle/High School) has been an accredited member of AdvancED (formerly North Central Association). Students complete a minimum of 26 courses and exams in regular and Advanced Placement (AP) classes with an opportunity to obtain college credit. Due to the small size of the school there are many classes which are not offered at the school, to make up for this the school offers virtual classes through what they call DoDEA Virtual School. The virtual classes are mostly run through the website Edgenuity and Schoology.

== Extracurricular activities ==
The DGF High School mascot and athletic emblem is the Admiral in honor of Adm. David Glasgow Farragut. The school colors are blue, white, and black.

=== Athletics ===
The Admirals compete in a variety of athletic activities at the Division II level and for an opportunity to win DODDS European Championships. Fall sports include: cheerleading, American football, volleyball, golf, and cross country; winter sports include: cheerleading, boys and girls basketball, and wrestling; spring sports include: soccer, softball, and track and field.

=== Clubs and activities ===
Honors Band & Choir, After School Club: Academic Support, Junior National Honor Society, Art Club, Color Guard, Math Counts, Spanish Club, Drama Club, Model US Senate, Student Council, Drill Team & Marksman Team, MS Intramurals, International club, Peer mediation team, Student 2 Student Club, Future Business Leaders of America, National Honor Society, Yearbook, Dungeons & Dragons, Makers Club, Educators Rising (Future Educators of America), GSA Club (Gender and Sexuality Alliance or Gay Straight Alliance), Multicultural Club, and Navy JROTC.

Accident

On June 30, 2020, Jaden Scrivener died in a car crash. The whole school was moved, and principles were put in place to "Live Like Jaden".
