= Istituto tecnico per le attività sociali =

Type of technical institute in Italy

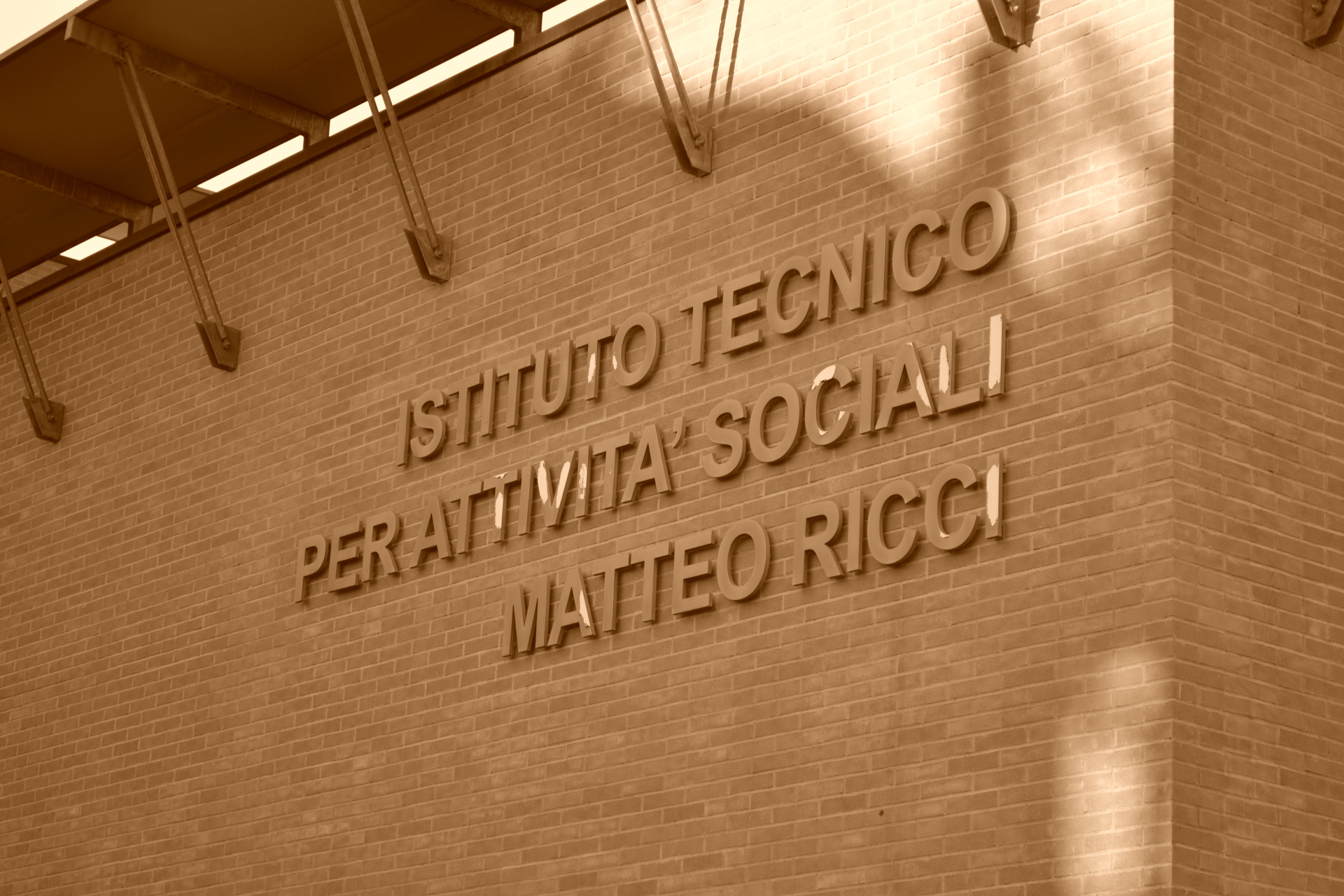
The istituto tecnico per le attività sociali Matteo Ricci, in Macerata

Istituto tecnico per attività sociali (literally "technical institute for social activities") is a type of technical institute in Italy. After the Gelmini reform it has been merged with the technical economic institute.

This specialized institute has contributed, in Italy and in Switzerland, to the professional and technical training of executive and senior staff in the economic sector of services, with particular regard to the link between management and social sciences and their legislative framework.

== History ==
It was founded in 1931, reformed in the fifties, sixties, and in 1998. After the 2010 Gelmini reform, because of its area of interest, it was merged with the Technical-Economic Institute with specialisation in Administration, Finance and Marketing, while some of its higher specialisations were directly moved to the university education. Students could attend the istituto tecnico per le attività sociali after successfully completing middle school scuola media (middle school) and were enabled to progress to any university institution.

In 2012, according to a study conducted in four regions of Italy by the business newspaper Il Sole 24 Ore and the Agnelli Foundation, a number of Istituti tecnici per le attività sociali were between the best secondary schools in terms of quality in Lombardy, Emilia-Romagna and Calabria.

== Structure ==
The curriculum is devised by the Ministry of Education, and emphasises the link between management, law, economy and social sciences.

After a common biennium, the course was divided into three specializing paths:

- Dirigenti di comunità ("community management"): had as its goal the training of students able to direct, organize, coordinate and manage facilities both public and private providing a multi-purpose training focused on sociology as well as a theoretical and practical competence of law and executive management. In 2010, the path has been renamed "Technical-Economic Institute with specialisation in Administration, Finance and Marketing".
- Economodietista ("eco-dietitian"): aimed to train technicians for organizations and cooperatives, providing a basic knowledge in science of nutrition, hygiene, accounting and statistics.
- Generale ("general"): through the study of human sciences, its goal was to train teachers and assistants to disabled people and the management of related technical activities.

The education given offers both a wide theoretical education and an accurate specialization in a field of studies (management, administration, law, humanities), often integrated with a six months internship in a company, association or university, during the fifth and last year of study.

Students are required to study for five years, and attend the school from the age of 14 to 19. At the end of the fifth year all students sit for the esame di maturità ("maturity exam"), a wide final examination which gave access to every university course. The degree given at the end of the main path is a high school diploma with a specialization in social science and management (diploma di istruzione secondaria superiore ad indirizzo tecnico attività sociali, specializzazione dirigenti di comunità, translated as "high school diploma in social sciences and management").
