= Forgotten Widows =

The "Forgotten Widows" are a group of women who were barred from receiving any compensation after the death of their United States Military spouses. As a result of the Survivor Benefit Plan being passed in the late 1970s, spouses of servicemembers who died before the act was put into effect were cut off from receiving any aid from the military.

The Department of Defense has repealed certain statutes barring the Forgotten Widows, a vocal minority in recent years, from receiving compensation. On 9 October 1980, the Uniformed Service Survivor Benefits Amendments of 1980 (P.L. 96-402) included the Forgotten Widows Survivor Benefit Plan which provided annuity payments to the widow or widower of a military member that died before 21 September 1972 in active duty. In 1997, legislation authorized a $165 monthly Annuities for Certain Military Surviving Spouses (ACMSS) benefit to forgotten widows of a military service member that died before the SBP program was implemented. The ACMSS is often referred to as the annuity for Forgotten Widows.

In 1999, the ACMSS benefit was $174.76 monthly, and it was also offered to widows of reservist members who had died before 1 October 1978.

In 2001, the DoD allowed widows of servicemembers who retired from active service before September 21, 1972, and died before March 21, 1974, to receive a monthly stipend, on the condition that the widow has not remarried.

The number of Forgotten Widows still alive is estimated to be in the thousands. Nearly 800 widows applied for compensation upon the relaxing of the Benefit Plan rules in 2001, with 550 applications approved.
