= ITC Luigi Paolini =

Istituto di Istruzione Superiore Paolini Cassiano

Location
- Coordinates: 44.34757°N 11.71825°E

Information
- Established: 1960
- Dirigente scolastico: prof Ernestina Spiotta

The Technical Institute Luigi Paolini (ITC Luigi Paolini), often referred to simply as il Paolini, is an Italian secondary school offering diplomas in administration, finance, marketing, accounting, computer programming, and international relations, as well as surveying.

Unified with the Professional Institute Cassiano da Imola, it forms a bigger institute, called "Paolini Cassiano"

== See also ==
- Education in Italy
