= Villaggio Coppola =

Settlement in Campania, Italy

- Frazione
- Location of Villaggio Coppola in Italy
- Coordinates: 40°58′26.22″N 13°59′25.68″E
- Country: Italy
- Region: Campania
- Province: Caserta (CE)
- Comune: Castel Volturno
- Elevation: 5 m (16 ft)
- Time zone: UTC+1 (CET)
  - Summer (DST): UTC+2 (CEST)
- Postal code: 81030
- Dialing code: (+39) 081

Villaggio Coppola (also known as Pinetamare) is a settlement in the Italian region of Campania, administratively a frazione of Castel Volturno. It has been accused of being built without the appropriate entitlements. The lawsuits, which started in the 1960s, were resolved in 2005 with a settlement.

== History ==
=== Construction ===
Villaggio Coppola is located along the Via Domiziana, beside the Tyrrhenian Sea between Castel Volturno and Naples. The village was built in the 1960s with the aim of creating a multipurpose seaside resort by the Coppola brothers, Vincenzo and Cristoforo Coppola, originally from Casal di Principe.

The first phase of construction began with the houses overlooking the sea, the shopping center, the access roads to the village and all the internal streets, sewage, electric network and a water treatment plant, the only one existing at that time on the Domitian coast.

The construction of tertiary and quaternary service infrastructure was completed in a second phase. The infrastructure included elementary, middle and high schools, police and carabinieri station, church, bank, pharmacy, cinema, discos, hotel.

=== Accusations of Illegal Development ===
All the developments carried out within the Village of Pinetamare, including the towers, were made with permits issued in the 1960s before the Law Galasso on landscape constraints was approved. In 1965, a series of legal disputes on entitlements began. The disputes implicate construction sites covering less than 5% of the area of the entire village. The construction permits for the 8 towers were revoked by the mayor of Castel Volturno, for defect of procedure (“difetto di procedura”). The Construction company Coppola Pinetamare appealed to the Council of State. The Council ruled in favor of Coppola Pinetamare and canceled the mayor’s act. The construction of the 8 towers was completed and the same towers were leased for 20 years to the U.S. Navy to accommodate the families of the American military of the Allied Joint Force Command Naples.

=== The Earthquakes of 1980s and Subsequent Crisis ===
Campania suffered several natural disasters: a first bradyseism in 1978, the 1980 Irpinia earthquake and a second bradyseism in 1983. These events dramatically highlighted the structural deficiencies in the construction of the Campania Region. A temporary solution was found in Pinetamare. From 1978 to 1988 more than 5000 displaced people were housed in its structures. The Government’s requisition of private housing units to accommodate earthquake victims quickly led to the degradation of the territory. A rapid private sell-off followed, causing a decline of values, loss of core residents and businesses, and subsequent increase in crime.

=== The End of 1990s and Rehabilitation ===
The issue regarding the legality of the construction of the Village dragged on for several decades. In 1998, an Extraordinary Commissioner was appointed to define a settlement agreement. In February 1999, a first document was signed, testifying the will to define in a settlement all the disputes in progress. In April 2001, the “Consorzio Rinascita” was constituted. In May 2001, by the signing of the Memorandum of Understanding with the Campania Region, the province of Caserta, the municipalities of Castel Volturno and Villa Literno, agreed to the realization of an articulated Plan of Rehabilitation, which included an environmental cleanup and socio-economic revival of the Domitian Coast. Between May 2001 and April 2003, the eight skyscrapers on the seashore were demolished as part of the Settlement.

On August 1, 2003, the Campania Region, the province of Caserta, the Municipality of Castel Volturno, the Municipality of Villa Literno, Consorzio Rinascita and Fontana Bleu S.p.A. signed a program agreement approving "The Redevelopment Plan for the eco-environmental rehabilitation and socio-economic revitalization for the Pinetamare locality of Castel Volturno and adjacent

Since 2017, the area is being revitalized under the leadership of the Consorzio Rinascita: a consortium of local private entities.
