= Naples Middle/High School =

Location
- Gricignano di Aversa, Campania, Province of Caserta, 81030; Italy; 40°59′23.19″N 14°14′41.42″E

Information
- School type: Public, high school
- Founded: 1953 (73 years ago)
- School district: DoDEA
- CEEB code: 577060
- Principal: Mr. Luis Dominguez
- Staff: Approx. 75 (2009)
- Grades: 7–12
- Enrollment: Approx. 750 (2009)
- Language: English
- Campus type: Suburban
- Colors: Green
- Mascot: Wildcat
- Rival: Aviano Middle/High School
- Feeder schools: Naples Elementary School
- Website: www.dodea.edu/NaplesMHS/index.cfm

Naples Middle/High School (NMHS), formerly known as Naples American High School, is a secondary school within the Department of Defense Education Activity system. It is located in Gricignano di Aversa, Campania, Italy.

== History ==
=== Early days ===
In the summer of 1951, a new NATO southern command called Headquarters Allied Forces, Southern Europe (AFSOUTH) was established in Naples, Italy. The school began with 7 - 8 American high school age students arriving with the command in October 1951. The facilities initially occupied a spare storage room in the Hotel Britannique in downtown Naples, where many of the student’s families lived. The school program provided high school correspondence courses through the University of Nebraska High School. It was named the American Forces Dependents High School, Naples, Italy.

During the summer and fall of 1951, more students arrived and the school was relocated to the Albergo Sant’Elmo, then the NATO Officers’ Club in the Vomero borough of Naples. This school of 15–18 students operated until August 1952. High School proctors during this period were Mr. Albert Trimarchi and Mr. Bob Newton. The first graduate of the school was Stewart A. Ring.

On October 1, 1952, a standard Department of Defense School was opened in the same location, the Albergo Sant’Elmo, with about 45 students. There were five students in the graduating class that year.

=== Official opening ===
In 1953 members of the senior class suggested that the school be named in honor of Admiral Forrest Sherman, the United States Chief of Naval Operations, who had died suddenly during that school year during a visit to Naples. The school opened in the fall of 1953 as Forrest Sherman High School. The Ring brothers, Bill and Stewart, suggested the school colors of green and white, after the colors of Coronado High School in San Diego, California. Both brothers had attended Coronado High School prior to their father being assigned to Naples in the summer of 1951. They also suggested the school mascot, the Wildcat, which continues to be the Naples High School mascot. According to the end of year publication, Ciao, there were 58 students that year with four graduating seniors.

Due to an increase in enrolment, the high school was moved to a larger building on Via Manzoni in the Posillipo section of the city beginning with the 1953–54 school year. That year grades 1–12 were contained in this building under the name Forrest Sherman Schools.

1960 marked the move of Forrest Sherman High School to another building further down Via Manzoni, across the street from the Scuola Svizzera, an international school run by the Swiss government. The panoramic view from the front of the school, overlooking the entire bay of Naples, with Mt. Vesuvius in the background, is considered perhaps the best view from any DoD school in the world. The school remained in this building until 1982. Eventually it included seventh and eighth grades and enrollment increased to almost 600 students.

In the fall of 1967, the sixth fleet flagship was assigned to Gaeta, Italy, having moved from Villefranche-sur-Mer, France. Students in grades 9–12 from Gaeta began attending Naples American High School that fall.

In 1982, the high school moved to the Agnano facility, called the “happy horseshoe,” because of its distinctive shape. That year all the elementary students were combined in the school complex at Villaggio Coppola, twenty miles north of Naples. In 1984, the name of the school was changed to Naples High School, in accordance with DoDEA policy to have school names better reflect their locations.

=== Later years ===
During the mid-1990s, construction was begun on a new US Navy Support Site north of Naples, near Gricignano di Aversa, which would eventually include all the support services located in Agnano and a large housing complex. New elementary and high schools were the first buildings opened at the US Navy Support Site. In August 1997, Naples Elementary School and Naples High School opened at the US Navy Support Site and welcomed 950 elementary and 560 high school students.

=== Present day ===
Naples High School continues the use of the traditional colors of green and white, along with the Wildcat mascot. Children of all NATO nationalities are accepted from the families assigned to Allied Joint Force Command Naples (JFC Naples, formerly AFSOUTH) and American installations in the greater Naples and Gaeta area. Students from the following nations have attended our school in recent years: Bosnia and Herzegovina, Bulgaria, Canada, Greece, Italy, Japan, Poland, Romania, Slovenia, Spain, Ukraine, United Kingdom, and the United States.

Naples American High School has transitioned through the years from one room in a hotel to its present modern facility with Internet connectivity in every classroom. School programs have moved from correspondence courses to such courses as the Cisco Networking Academy, Computer Services and Support, and advanced placement courses in English, Mathematics, Science, History, Computer Programming, and Art. Support services are provided in English, reading, mathematics, and learning strategies. Students who are “in the middle” and show academic potential are provided support through the AVID program.

In 1994, the school added the Naval Junior Reserve Officers Training Corps (NJROTC) to the curriculum. The unit has been very successful over the years earning many trophies in Exhibition Drill, Rifle Team, Academics and Orienteering. For a number of years, it hosted a sailing club with 6 sunfish sailboats. The unit has taken Unit Achievement or Distinguished Unit every year since 2004. It currently has 65 cadets (2016).

For the 2009–2010 school year, Naples Athletics were Division II champions for Cross Country, Boys Volleyball, Girls Soccer, and Softball. In the fall of 2010, the Boys Volleyball team lost to Aviano in the semi-finals and placed third in the Mediterranean District. Boys Cross Country were Division II Champions and Girls Cross County came second in the Division II Championships. Cheerleading, Girls Soccer, and Softball also won Division II Championships during the 2010–2011 school year. The Boys Cross Country Team kept their title of European Champions during their 2011–2012 year also. Before the 2014–2015 school year, the continuing success of Naples teams in Division II and its increasing size caused DODEA Athletics to move Naples up to Division I in every sport except for football. Naples won their only DI championship in Boys Soccer in 2019, the final year before being moved back down to Division II. Along with this championship; Girls Soccer, Girls Volleyball, Cheer, Tennis, Wrestling, and Basketball have had teams or individual athletes place 2nd or 3rd in Division I. The 2018 football team, featuring current Las Vegas Raiders star running back Ashton Jeanty, finished undefeated. (Jeanty returned to the U.S. the next season.)

== See also ==
- Aviano Middle/High School
- Vicenza American High School
- La Scuola d'Italia Guglielmo Marconi – Italian international school in New York City
- Allied Joint Force Command Naples
