= Aviano Middle/High School =

Department of Defense Education Activity secondary school

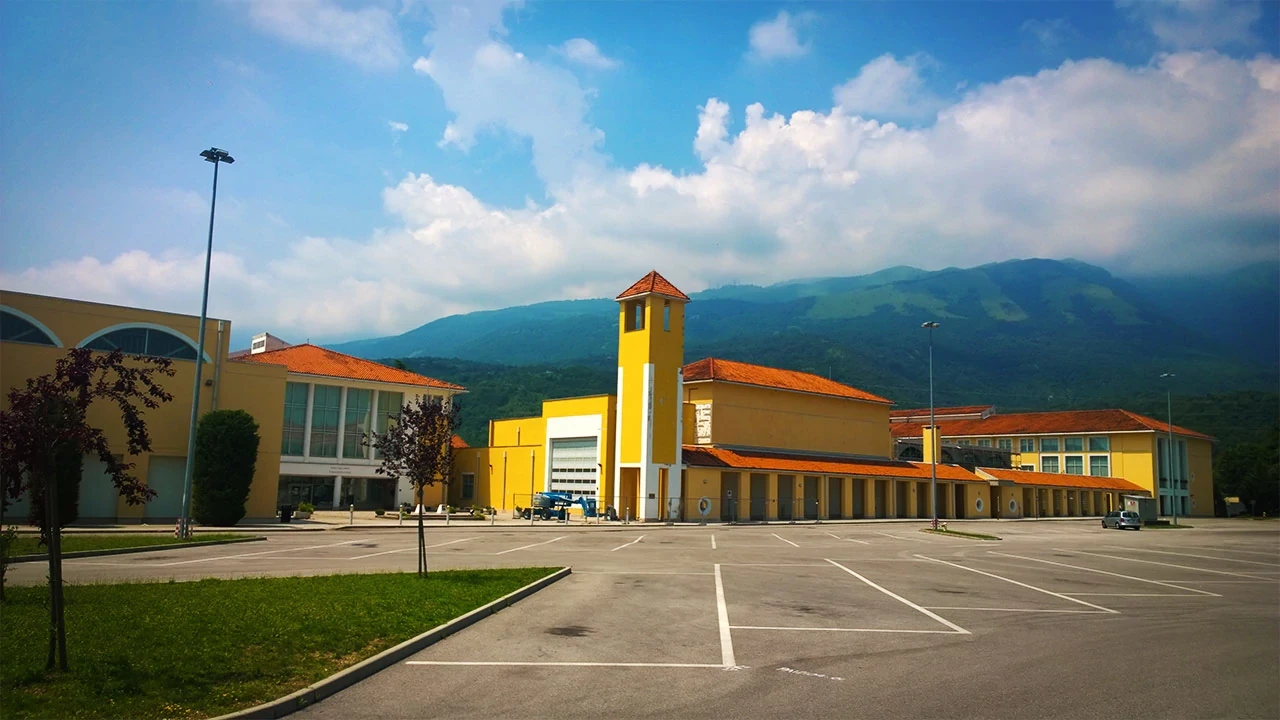
- The school is at the foot of the Italian Dolomites

Location
- Aviano; Italy
- Coordinates: 46°4′4″N 12°34′38″E

Information
- School type: DoDEA Secondary, American school, international school
- School district: DoDEA Mediterranean District
- CEEB code: 577099
- Principal: Mr. Mustapha Kahlouch
- Grades: 6-12
- Enrollment: Approx. 500
- Colors: Red, blue, and white
- Mascot: Saint
- Rival: Naples Middle/High School
- Website: www.dodea.edu/AvianoMHS/index.cfm
- (United States) (Italy)

Aviano Middle/High School (previously Aviano American High School) is a Department of Defense Education Activity secondary school located on the Italian-owned NATO air base in Aviano, Italy, which hosts the 31st Fighter Wing. The majority of students are dependents of active duty military personnel, Department of Defense employees, contractors and diplomats, although a small percentage are children of other English-speaking expatriates or local Italian residents.

As of the 2008–2009 school year, Aviano Middle School and Aviano High School were joined into one school serving grades 6–12. It is classified as a Division II school in DoDEA Europe.

The school's mascot is the saint.

== History ==
The current building began operations in 2002.

== Athletics ==
The athletic program at Aviano Middle/High School is open to high school students and some middle school students. Competitions take place throughout the year in the DoDEA Europe Division II league as well as the American International Schools Italian League. Athletes follow the DoDEA Europe athletic code.

=== Fall ===
- Football
- Cross country
- Volleyball Women
- Volleyball Men
- Tennis
- Cheerleading
- Swimming (community sponsored)

=== Winter ===
- Basketball Men and Women
- Wrestling
- Cheerleading
- Swimming (community sponsored)
- Air Force JROTC drill team (AFJROTC sponsored)

=== Spring ===
- Track and field
- Softball
- Baseball
- Soccer Men and Women

== Extracurricular ==
Clubs, organizations, and events exist for students to join or take part in:

- Academic Bowl
- Air Force JROTC (offered as a class)
- Air Force JROTC Drill Team
- Book Club
- Cisco (offered as a class)
- Creative Connections
- Drama/Theatre
- Future Business Leaders of America (FBLA)
- Future Educators Association (FEA)
- Future Educators Association Honor Society (must be selected to join)
- Hinterbrand outdoors club
- International Leadership Institute (ISLI)
- Lingua Fest Language Festival
- Math Counts
- Model U.S. Senate
- National Honors Society (must be selected to join)
- National Junior Honor Society (must be selected to join)
- Peer Mediation
- Robotics Club
- Student 2 Student
- Student newspaper (offered as a class)
- Tutoring
- Yearbook (offered as a class)

== Student government ==
The purpose of the student government at Aviano is to provide everyone with a chance to have a say in what goes on in the student body. The student government acts as advocates to the administration on behalf of students. They also organize school events such as pep rallies and dances. Each office is headed by a president, vice president, secretary, treasurer, and a public relations officer.

- Executive Office – Serves as main advocates for the school, handles school wide issues. Officers are elected by the students.
- Senior Class – Handles senior issues and events including graduation. Officers are elected by 12th grade students
- Junior Class – Organizes the Junior and Senior Prom, handles Junior issues, officers are elected by 11th grade students
- Sophomore Class – Handles Sophomore issues, officers are elected by 10th grade students
- Freshmen Class – Handles Freshmen issues, officers are elected by 9th grade students

== Advanced/Accelerated and International Baccalaureate (IB) courses ==
Aviano Middle/High School offers Honors and Advanced Placement (AP) courses for high school students.

=== English ===
- Honors English (9th)
- Honors World Literature (10th) – Joint with Honors World Hist
- AP Language and Composition (11th)
- AP English Literature (12th)

=== History/Social Studies ===
- Honors History (9th)
- Honors World History (10th) – Joint with Honors World Lit
- AP U.S. History (11th-12th)
- AP Government (11th-12th)

=== Math ===
- AP Calculus
- AP Statistics

=== Science ===
- AP Biology
- AP Human Anatomy and Physiology

=== Other ===
- AP Psychology
- AP Economics

There are online AP courses

=== International Baccalaureate ===
- IB courses are available and offered online

The Honors World Literature and History classes are combined classes. Students who take one must take the other and receive a joint performance grade that is averaged together.

The AP classes are weighted grades on a student's GPA.

== See also ==
- Vicenza American High School
- Naples Middle/High School
- Aviano Air Base
- Military brats
- DoDEA European Championships
- List of high schools in U.S. territories
