= Marymount International School of Rome =

Marymount International School Rome
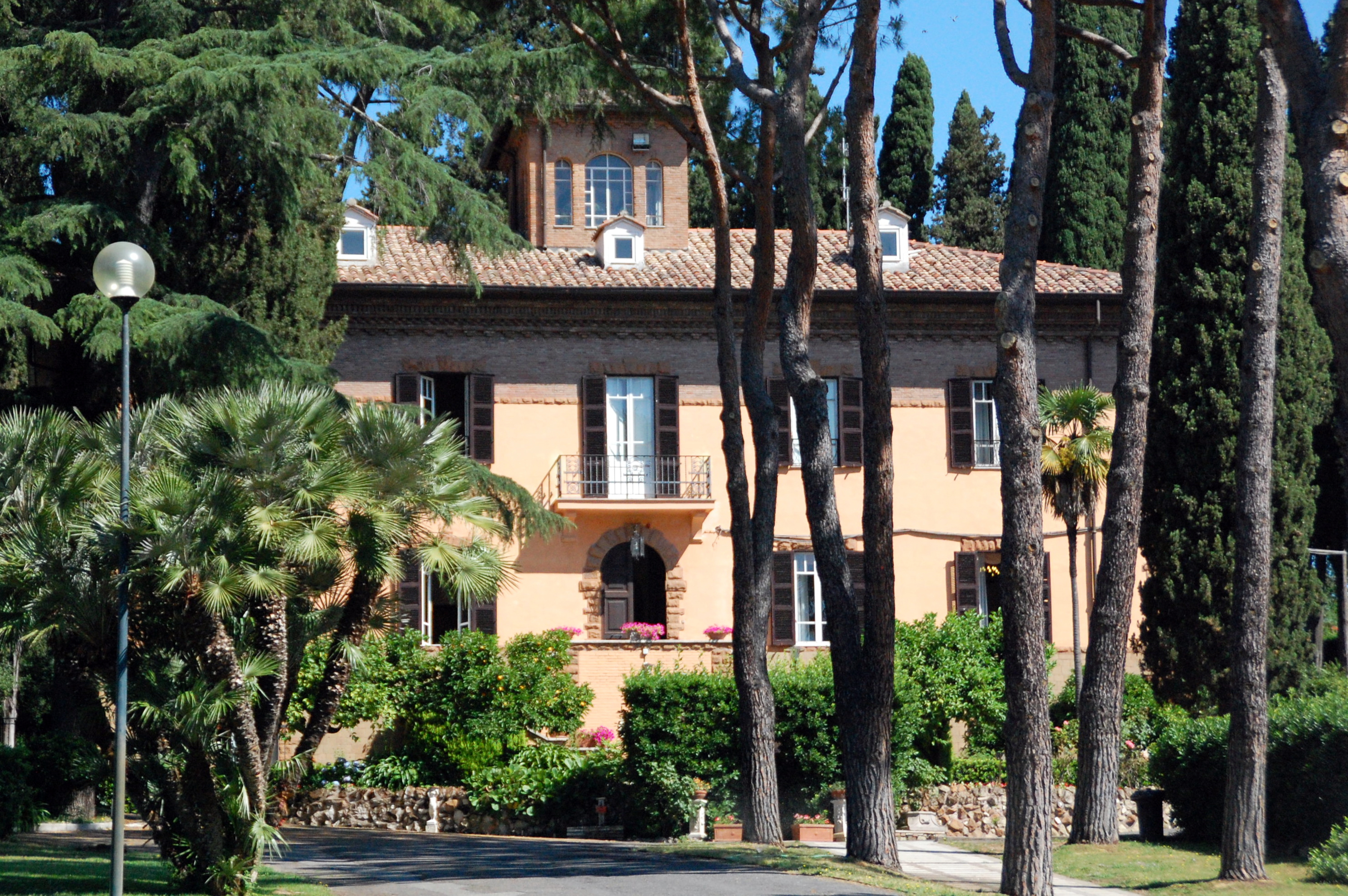
- The Villa at Marymount International School Rome
- Via di Villa Lauchli, 180, 00191, Rome, Italy

Information
- Type: Private School, international school
- Religious affiliation: Roman Catholic
- Established: 1946; 80 years ago
- Head of school: Ms. Paulina Skerman
- Staff: 100+
- Grades: Early Childhood - Grade 12
- Gender: Co-educational
- Enrollment: 946 students from 94 nationalities
- Average class size: 15-20 students
- Education system: Advanced Placement, American High School Diploma, International Baccalaureate Diploma Program
- Campus size: 40 acres (16 ha)
- Colors: Blue and white
- Mascot: Royals
- Website: www.marymountrome.com

Marymount International School Rome is a private, international, Catholic, co-educational day school. Founded in 1946, It follows the American grading system and a part of the Global Network of RSHM Schools which includes 19 Marymount schools in Europe, North America, and South America founded by the Religious of the Sacred Heart of Mary (RSHM).

The school offers an English-language American and International curriculum from Early Childhood through Grade 12 (ages 2 to 18), a longstanding International Baccalaureate (IB) diploma program and an American High School Diploma, as well as AP courses, and extracurricular activities, which take place on their 40-acre campus in northern Rome. It also offers the Italian Esami di Stato (state exams) for the Terza Media (8th grade).

Facilities include several science laboratories, two libraries with multi-media centers, art and music studios, an Auditorium, the Early Childhood Center Outdoor Classroom, Garden and Playground, and the Dining Hall in addition to a regulation-size soccer field and several other sports areas. The one-to-one laptop program in the Secondary School is supported by high-speed Internet connections in the classrooms. Enrichment opportunities are offered across all Grade Levels.

Marymount is accredited by the International Baccalaureate Organization (IBO), Council of International Schools (CIS) and the Middle States Association (MSA).
