= Vicenza American High School =

Department of Defense school in Vicenza, Veneto, Italy

Coordinates: 45.5486°N 11.5826°E

Vicenza High School
- Vicenza, Veneto; Italy

Information
- Type: Department of Defense School
- Established: 1954 (72 years ago)
- CEEB code: 577140
- Principal: Michael Jimerson (Acting Principal)
- Faculty: 58 (in 2008)
- Grades: 9–12
- Enrollment: 299 (in 2024)
- Colors: Black, gold, and white
- Mascot: Cougar
- Website: www.dodea.edu/VicenzaHS/index.cfm

Vicenza American High School (VHS) is a Department of Defense Education Activity (DoDEA) high school located in Vicenza, Italy, on Villaggio Della Pace, a US garrison base. Previously on Caserma Ederle, a new building was opened on Villaggio Della Pace in August 2023. Parkhill was the primary architecture firm for this project.

It was founded in 1954 by Eric Hall.

== Course selection ==
=== Business programs ===
- Business and Personal Finance
- Career Practicum
- International Business Management

=== English/Language Arts ===
- AP Language
- AP Literature
- Language 9
- Language 10
- Language 11
- Language 12

=== Fine Arts ===
- Drawing
- Fundamentals Of Art
- Painting
- Photography
- Sculpture

=== Foreign Language ===
- AP Italian
- Italian I
- Italian II
- Italian III
- Italian IV
- Spanish I
- Spanish II
- Spanish III
- Spanish IV

=== Health Education ===
- Health
- Nutrition

=== Mathematics ===
- AP Calculus
- AP Statistics
- Algebra I
- Algebra II
- Discrete Math
- Geometry
- Pre-Calculus

=== Music ===
- Band I
- Band II
- Band III
- Beginning Chorus
- Intermediate Chorus

=== Physical Education ===
- Conditioning
- Physical Education (P.E.)

=== Professional Technical Studies ===
- Adobe Photoshop
- Microsoft Excel
- Microsoft PowerPoint
- Microsoft Word
- Video Communication III
- Video Communications II
- Video Communications I
- Yearbook

=== Science ===
- AP Biology
- AP Chemistry
- Biology
- Chemistry
- Human Anatomy
- Physics

=== Social Studies ===
- AP Global Studies
- AP Government
- AP Psychology
- AP United States History
- Global Studies I
- Global Studies II
- Government
- Model United Nations (MUN)
- Psychology
- United States History

== Clubs ==
- Social Studies Honors Society (SSHS)
- National Honors Society (NHS)
- Spanish Honors Society (SHS)
- Italian Honors Society (IHS)
- Math Honors Society (MHS)
- Strait and Gay Alliance (SAGA)
- Red Cross
- Speech and Debate
  - Speech and Debate is by far the largest club at Vicenza High School, with over 10% of the student body participating.
- German Club
- French Club
- Video Game Club
- Computer Science Club
- Model United Nations (MUN)
- Model United States Senate (MUSS)
- Environmental Club

== Athletics ==
The high school varsity teams are nicknamed the Cougars. Varsity sports teams include: Boys' and Girls' Basketball, Soccer, Volleyball, Track & Field, Cross Country, Rifle Team, Tennis, Football, Wrestling, Softball, Baseball and Cheerleading.

=== Championships ===
- 1981
  - ASIL Football Champions
  - ASIL Wrestling Champions
- 1984
  - ASIL Boys Cross Country Champions
  - ASIL Boys Basketball Champions
  - ASIL Girls Basketball Champions
  - ASIL Boys Track and Field Champions
  - ASIL Boys Singles Tennis Champions & Team Champions (Doubles Team finished 2nd)
- 1985
  - ASIL Boys Basketball Champions
- 1990
  - ASIL Boys Football Champions
  - ASIL Boys Track and Field Champions
  - Stars and Stripes Athlete of The Year (Howard Buckner)
  - All European Boys Football, Basketball and Track (Howard Buckner)
- 1992
  - ASIL Boys Football Champions
- 1993
  - ASIL Boys Football Champions
  - ASIL Boys Cross Country Champions
  - ASIL Girls Cross Country Champions
- 1999
  - D-III All European Football Champions
- 2001
  - ASIL Boys Basketball Champions
- 2003
  - ASIL Boys Volleyball Champions
- 2005
  - All Europe Wrestling Championship Runner Up (Gary King)
- 2006
  - All Europe Wrestling Championship (Shane Hinton)
  - Athlete of the Year (Shane Hinton)
- 2007
  - All Europe Wrestling Championship Runner Up (Kyle Kaus)
- 2008
  - D-III Girls Basketball Runner Up
  - Cheerleading 2nd Place at Europeans
  - All Europe Wrestling Championship Runner Up (Kyle Kaus)
  - 3rd Place CO_{2} Dragster Race PTS Expo (Tia Lopez)
- 2009
  - D-III Baseball Runner-Up
  - D-III Boys Track & Field 2nd Place at Europeans
  - D-III Girls Track & Field 2nd Place at Europeans
  - D-II South Champions (Football)
  - All Europe Wrestling Championship (Kyle Kaus)
  - D-III European 3rd Place (Softball)
- 2010
  - D-II South Championships for Girls Soccer
  - D-II 3rd Place European Tournament/ Mediterranean Champions (Girls Volleyball)
- 2011
  - D-II European Champions (Girls Basketball)Coach Michael F. James, Sr.
  - D-II 2nd Place European Championships (Girls Soccer/Baseball)
  - 4th place European Championships Triple Jump (Gary Donald)
  - Gary Donald number one long jumper in Europeans
  - Athlete of the Year (Gary Donald)
- 2012
  - D-II European Champions (Wrestling)
- 2013
  - D-II European Champions (Softball)
  - D-II European Runners-up (Baseball/Soccer)
  - D-II European 3rd Place at Europeans (Boys Basketball)
  - D-II European Champions (Wrestling)
- 2014
  - D-II European Champions (Softball)
  - D-II European Runners-up (Baseball)
- 2016
  - D-| European Runners-up (Girls Basketball)
  - D-I European Runners-up (Girls Volleyball)
- 2024
  - D-II European champions (Boys Basketball)
- 2025
  - D-II European Champions (Boys Basketball)

== Notable attendees ==
- Sharon Tate (1961), Hollywood Actress.
- Chip Flowers (1992), Delaware State Treasurer and co-chair of the National Democratic State Treasurers. He was the first African-American statewide elected official in the state.
- John Bonamego, (1979), special teams coach for the Detroit Lions, former head coach at Central Michigan University.
- Adrian Murrell (1988. Murrell attended junior high in Vicenza, but moved to Hawaii for high school and did not graduate from VHS) NFL running back who played for the New York Jets, Arizona Cardinals, Washington Redskins and Dallas Cowboys.
